= 2/2nd Machine Gun Battalion =

Former battalion of the Australian Army

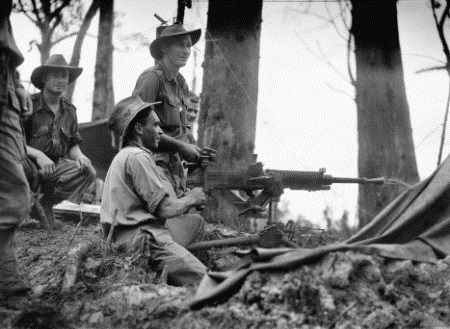
- 2/2nd Machine Gun Battalion personnel operating a captured Japanese machine gun on Tarakan in 1945
- Active: 1940–1946
- Country: Australia
- Branch: Australian Army
- Type: Infantry
- Role: Direct fire support
- Size: ~ 800–900 personnel
- Part of: 7th Division; 9th Division
- Engagements: World War II: North African campaign; New Guinea campaign; Borneo campaign

Commanders
- Notable commanders: David Whitehead

Insignia
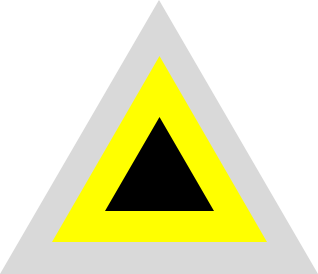
- Unit colour patch (1940–42)

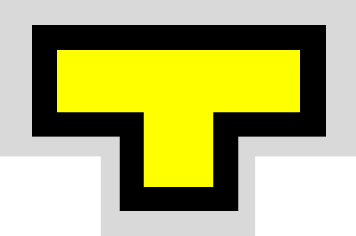
- (1942–46)

The 2/2nd Machine Gun Battalion was an infantry support unit of the all-volunteer Second Australian Imperial Force that was raised for service overseas during the Second World War. Formed in mid-1940 in Sydney, from personnel drawn from the states of Queensland and New South Wales, the battalion was allocated to the Australian 9th Division. After completing training in Australia, the battalion operated in the Middle East between early 1941 and early 1943, seeing action against German and Italian forces at the First and Second Battles of El Alamein, and undertaking garrison duties in Syria as part of the Allied garrison that was established there after the Syria–Lebanon campaign.

In early 1943, the 2/2nd was brought back to Australia to fight several campaigns against the Japanese. The first of these came in September 1943 when the battalion landed east of Lae in New Guinea and then took part in the advance to secure the town, which fell within a fortnight. This was followed by fighting on the Huon Peninsula, which saw the battalion undertake an amphibious landing at Scarlet Beach and then take part in actions around Finschhafen, Sattelberg and Sio until it was withdrawn back to Australia in early 1944. In mid-1945, the machine gunners from the 2/2nd supported landings on Tarakan, Labuan and Brunei Bay as part of Allied efforts to recapture Borneo. After the war, the battalion was disbanded in February 1946.

== History ==
=== Formation and training ===
The 2/2nd Machine Gun Battalion (Note: The numerical designation of 2nd AIF units was prefixed by "2/", which was used to set them apart from Militia units or units of the First Australian Imperial Force, which did not use a prefix.) was one of four machine gun battalions that were raised as part of the all-volunteer Second Australian Imperial Force (2nd AIF) for service overseas during the Second World War. Motorised infantry units, equipped with wheeled motor vehicles, motor cycles and sometimes tracked carriers, the machine gun battalions were formed to provide a greater level of support by fire than that which was organically available within ordinary infantry battalions.

Developed by the British Army, the concept within the Australian Army had its genesis during the Gallipoli Campaign in 1915, when the machine guns assigned to the infantry battalions – initially two and then, later, four – had been grouped together and co-ordinated at brigade level to help compensate for the lack of artillery support. Over the course of the war, on the Western Front the concept had evolved through the establishment of machine gun companies in 1916 and machine gun battalions in 1918. Similar formations had also been established among the Australian Light Horse units serving in the Sinai and Palestine Campaign. During the inter-war years, the machine gun battalions had been deemed unnecessary. When the Army was reorganised in 1921, they were not re-raised, but in 1937, as the Army looked to expand as fears of war in Europe loomed, four such units were raised within the part-time Militia, by converting light horse units and motorising them. When the Second World War broke out, the decision was made to raise several machine gun battalions within the 2nd AIF, allocated at a rate of one per division.

The 2/2nd Machine Gun Battalion was formed on 2 May 1940, in Sydney. Upon formation, the battalion was assigned to the 7th Division, the 2nd AIF's second division – there were also five infantry divisions as part of the Militia at this time – and its personnel were recruited from two Australian states: Queensland and New South Wales, with many having served previously in the Militia with various light horse regiments and infantry battalions. The battalion's first commanding officer was Lieutenant Colonel David Whitehead, who had previously commanded the 1st Light Horse (Machine Gun) Regiment (Royal New South Wales Lancers). The nucleus of its trained personnel were also drawn from this regiment, as well as several Queensland-based Militia units. The colours chosen for the battalion's unit colour patch (UCP) were gold and black, in a triangular shape with a border of grey; this was later changed, though, following the unit's involvement in the fighting at Tobruk, when it adopted a T-shaped UCP.

Because of the geographic dislocation of its recruits, basic training was undertaken separately with Queenslanders completing their induction at Redbank in the Greater Brisbane area and New South Welshmen undertaking theirs at Ingleburn and then Cowra in the New South Wales Central Tablelands, before the battalion finally concentrated at Pyrmont in New South Wales, in late 1940. At this point, the unit's establishment was completed, as the battalion structure was finalised. It was structured along the same lines as the other 2nd AIF machine gun battalions, which consisted of between 800 and 900 personnel organised into a headquarters element consisting of three platoons – signals, anti-aircraft and administration – and four machine gun companies, each equipped with 12 Vickers machine guns, to make a total of 48 across the entire battalion. Within the machine gun companies there were three platoons; normally these were numbered sequentially starting from 1 to 3 in Headquarters Company through to 13 to 15 in 'D' Company; however, the 2/2nd differed from other Australian machine gun battalions, designating its platoons alphanumerically: A1, A2, A3 through to D1, D2, and D3. A Light Aid Detachment of electrical and mechanical engineers was also attached. After a period of further training, the battalion was ready to deploy overseas, and in February 1941, the unit embarked for the Middle East, departing from Sydney aboard the transport Aquitania.

=== Service in the Middle East ===
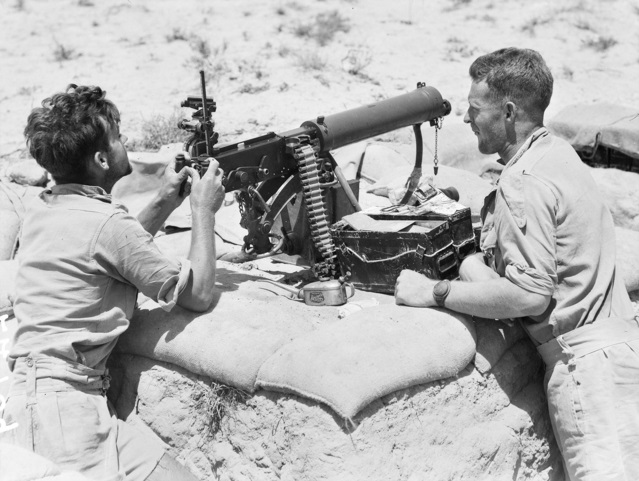
Machine gunners from the 2/2nd at Tel el Eisa, August 1942

After arriving in the Middle East, the 2/2nd Machine Gun Battalion conducted more training in Palestine until April 1941 when it was transported to Mersa Matruh, where the battalion began a year-long period serving in the garrison role. Towards the end of this period – January 1942 – the battalion was reassigned to the 9th Division and moved to Syria where it undertook further garrison duty as part of the Allied occupation force that had been established after the Syria–Lebanon campaign to defend against a possible German attack across the Caucasus Mountains. This came to an end in late June 1942 when the 9th was rushed to El Alamein to help establish a hasty defence line.

Throughout July, the battalion's companies were detached to support individual Australian brigades during the First Battle of El Alamein as the Allied forces – which had, since the beginning of the year, been steadily pushed back by the German and Italian forces – fought desperately to stop the German advance east towards Cairo. Supporting the infantry battalions fighting around Tel el Eisa in early July, several of the battalion's crews played significant roles in turning back attacks on the Australian positions, and in concert with divisional artillery were reported to have inflicted heavy casualties upon the German and Italian soldiers. Later, in the middle of the month, they supported an attack by the 2/32nd Infantry Battalion, now commanded by the 2/2nd's old commander, Whitehead, around Makh Khad Ridge to the right of the Qattara Track. By the end of the month the offensive had come to a halt and during the lull that followed the battalion provided defensive fire from depth positions. In October, it joined the second Allied counter-attack that was launched during the Second Battle of El Alamein. During these battles, the battalion was heavily engaged, with a company supporting a composite force under Whitehead, and another operating in support of the 24th Brigade. Its casualties amounted to 21 killed, 128 wounded and 26 captured.

At the conclusion of the El Alamein fighting, the 2/2nd Machine Gun Battalion was withdrawn to Gaza in early December, remaining there with the rest of the 9th Division until embarking on the Queen Mary for Australia in late January 1943, as part of the final withdrawal of Australian ground units from the Middle East to the Pacific to fight the Japanese.

=== Fighting in New Guinea and Borneo ===
Upon their return, a period of leave followed after which the battalion was re-constituted on the Atherton Tablelands in Queensland in April 1943. The battalion was subsequently retrained, re-equipped and reorganised to prepare it for the rigours of jungle warfare and throughout this time several drafts of reinforcements were received. These were mainly drawn from the states of South Australia and Western Australia, which changed the demographics of the battalion's personnel. Some personnel were also drawn from Europeans who had been living in New Guinea. Finally, the battalion received orders to deploy to the territory of Papua, and in August 1943 the 2/2nd arrived at Milne Bay, which had been developed into a large Allied base after the fighting there the previous year. After a month of garrison duties and work parties, the battalion was committed to the final actions of the Salamaua–Lae campaign. In early September 1943, it took part in the landing at Lae, as the 9th and 7th Divisions rushed to secure the town. During the 9th's landing east of the town, the battalion suffered 29 casualties in a single Japanese air attack, but overall the battalion's involvement in the advance resulted in only limited casualties as its personnel were mainly used to unload stores and equipment, as well providing local defence.

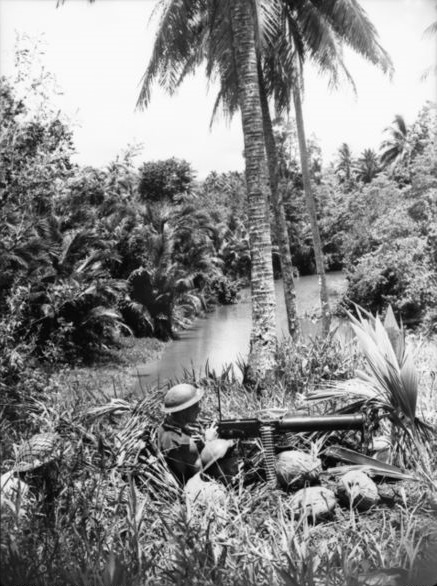
A machine team from the 2/2nd around Scarlet Beach, October 1943

Lae fell sooner than anticipated and the Allies moved quickly to consolidate, dispatching the 9th Division to secure the Huon Peninsula in late September. During the initial landing at Scarlet Beach, only one company from the 2/2nd was deployed – 'C' Company – in support of the 20th Brigade. Initially, the company was responsible for defending the beachhead around Scarlet Beach, but as the Australians fanned out and advanced south where Japanese resistance intensified, the machine gunners began patrolling operations further afield to the north and west. Once Finschhafen had been secured in early October, the Australians increased the size of their force ashore, landing the 24th Brigade, and along with it, the rest of the 2/2nd Machine Gun Battalion. After this, the battalion formed the main part of the divisional reserve, carrying out labouring tasks and maintaining a mobile reserve to counter-attack if necessary. In November, as the 26th Brigade attacked Sattelberg, the machine guns of 'B' Company were used in an offensive role for the first time during the campaign. Following the fall of Sattelberg, elements of the battalion supported the advance to Wareo before supporting the subsequent advance to Sio as the Australians followed up the retreating Japanese. During December, 'A' Company was detached in support of the Militia 4th Brigade, before the 20th Brigade resumed the lead, marching on to Sio in mid-January 1944. The battalion remained in New Guinea until late February, unloading ships, before embarking upon the transport Seasnipe on 25 February as the 9th Division were relieved by the 5th and withdrawn to Australia for rest and reorganisation. After a short voyage, the 2/2nd disembarked in Brisbane in early March 1944. Total casualties sustained by the battalion in New Guinea were 12 dead and 53 wounded.

A long period of relative inactivity subsequently followed as a result of inter-Allied service politics which saw the US Army assume primacy of operations in the Pacific, and indecision about the future role of Australian forces in the Pacific campaign. During this time, the battalion was based around Ravenshoe in Queensland, and was virtually rebuilt, having fallen to a strength of just over 250 personnel due to the effects of tropical diseases and losses suffered during the previous campaign. The battalion was transferred to the "tropical war establishment" during this period as part of an Army-wide reorganisation intended to optimise units for jungle warfare. As a result of this change, the battalion was no longer considered a motorised unit with its guns largely being carried across the battlefield by soldiers moving on foot. It was mostly a notional change as the battalion had lost the majority of its vehicles when the machine gunners had embarked from the Middle East earlier the previous year when the 9th Division had returned most of its equipment to the British. A small number of vehicles had been allocated to the battalion for its previous campaign in New Guinea, amounting to just six jeeps and two five-tonne 6 × 6 GMC tractors. This had proven insufficient to maintain supplies, though, and so with the re-organisation this was increased so that each company headquarters had two jeeps, with another four equipped with trailers being provided to each machine gun company for resupply. This represented a total of 19 jeeps and trailers across the whole battalion.

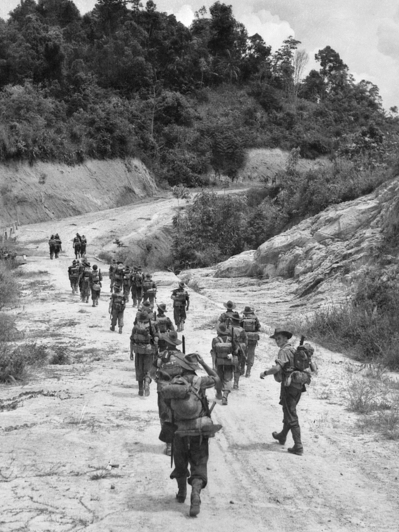
Members of B Company of the 2/2nd Machine Gun Battalion moving along a road between Brooketon and Brunei during the Borneo Campaign

After over a year, the battalion was committed to its final campaign of the war, transiting through Morotai Island as it joined the fighting on Borneo. 'D' Company supported the 26th Brigade during its assault on Tarakan Island in May, while the rest of the battalion supported the landings on Labuan Island and around Brunei Bay during the Battle of North Borneo. It was a short, but sharp campaign. During this time, in addition to their normal close support role, the machine gunners were often used as infantry, conducting extensive patrolling in search of Japanese stragglers which resulted in a number of clashes, as well as conducting defensive tasks against infiltrators and raiding parties. In North Borneo, a number of members of the battalion were also used to assist with the operation of a narrow gauge railway which had been brought back into service to maintain the Australian supply line. In early August, the dropping of the atomic bombs on Hiroshima and Nagaskai brought the war to an end. The battalion's casualties during the campaign in Borneo totaled five dead and six wounded, while casualties on Tarakan amounted to five soldiers killed or wounded.

=== Disbandment ===
In late August the 2/2nd was concentrated on the island of Labuan where it was tasked with setting up and running a reception camp for released Allied prisoners of war and internees prior to their repatriation, doing so until late December when the camp was finally closed. Meanwhile, following the conclusion of hostilities, the battalion's personnel were slowly transferred to other units or repatriated back to Australia for demobilisation. In January 1946, the 2/2nd's remaining personnel returned to Australia and the following month, on 26 February, the unit was disbanded. Throughout the course of the war, a total of 1,824 personnel served within the unit. One member, the author Eric Lambert, based some of the content in his works, including The Twenty Thousand Thieves, on the events he witnessed while serving with the battalion. The battalion lost 67 men killed or died on active service, while a further 193 were wounded and 28 were captured. Members of the battalion received the following decorations: two Distinguished Service Orders, one Military Cross, one Distinguished Conduct Medal, five Military Medals and 20 Mentions in Despatches.

After the war, the Australian Army moved away from the machine gun battalion construct and consequently no similar units have been raised since, with the role being subsumed into the support companies of individual infantry battalions. The concept was arguably misunderstood by Australian commanders throughout the war, and this may have influenced the decision to move away from the concept. When the units had been established, the intent had been that the machine gun battalions would provide highly mobile fire support; however, this was largely only applicable in theatres where principles of open warfare could be applied. Once the focus of Australian Army combat operations shifted to the Pacific, the machine gun battalions were largely misused, being employed in a static defensive capacity against short and medium range targets, or for menial tasks, rather than as offensive fire support weapons that could have been employed to provide long range fire support. The medium machine guns were also largely used in the same manner as light machine guns, such as the Bren. Other reasons identified for the concept's limited use include distrust of overhead fire by some commanders, a preference for organic fire support over attached sub-units, over-estimating the difficulty of transporting Vickers guns in the jungle, and a tendency to ignore targets that could not be seen. The difficulties of target acquisition in dense jungle also contributed.

== Commanding officers ==
The 2/2nd Machine Gun Battalion was commanded by the following officers:

- Lieutenant Colonel David Whitehead (1940–42)
- Lieutenant Colonel Edward Macarthur-Onslow (1942–45);
- Lieutenant Colonel Arthur Searle (1945).

== Battle honours ==
The 2/2nd Machine Gun Battalion was awarded the following battle honours:

- North Africa 1941–42; Defence of Alamein Line; Ruweisat Ridge; Sanyet el Miteirya; El Alamein; South-West Pacific 1943–45; Lae–Nadzab; Finschhafen; Sattelberg; Borneo; Brunei and Labuan.

== Notes ==
Footnotes

Citations
