= Tadji =

Tadji may refer to:

- Tadji, Iraq, a town in Iraq
- Tadji, Papua New Guinea, a town in Papua New Guinea
