= Battle of Aitape =

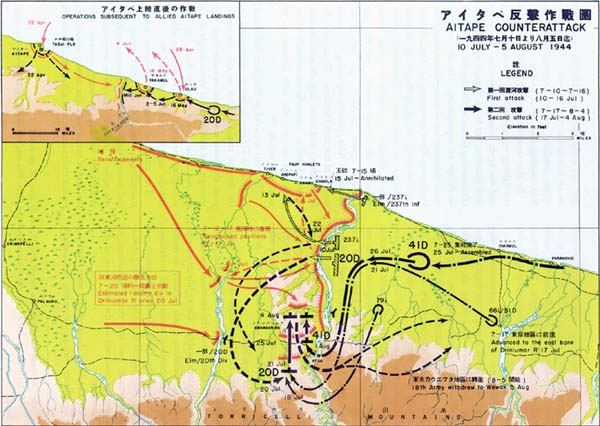

The name Battle of Aitape or Aitape campaign may refer to any one of three military actions in proximity to Aitape in the Western New Guinea campaign of 1944-45:

- Operations Reckless and Persecution, which included landings at Aitape on April 22, 1944.
- Battle of Driniumor River, also known as the Battle of Aitape, July 10-August 25, 1944
- Aitape–Wewak campaign, which commenced in November 1944 and continued until the end of the war.
