= Tadji Airport =

Airport in Tadji, Papua New Guinea

- IATA: TAJ; ICAO: none

Summary
- Location: Tadji, Papua New Guinea
- Elevation AMSL: 16 ft / 5 m
- Coordinates: 3°11′56.4″S 142°25′42″E

Map
- Location of airport in Papua New Guinea

Runways
| Direction | Length | | Surface |
| Direction | m | ft | Surface |
|---|---|---|---|
| 10/28 | 1,280 | 4,199 |
- Source: PNG Airstrip Guide

Tadji Airport (IATA: TAJ) is an airfield serving Tadji, near Aitape, in the Sandaun Province of Papua New Guinea.

== History ==
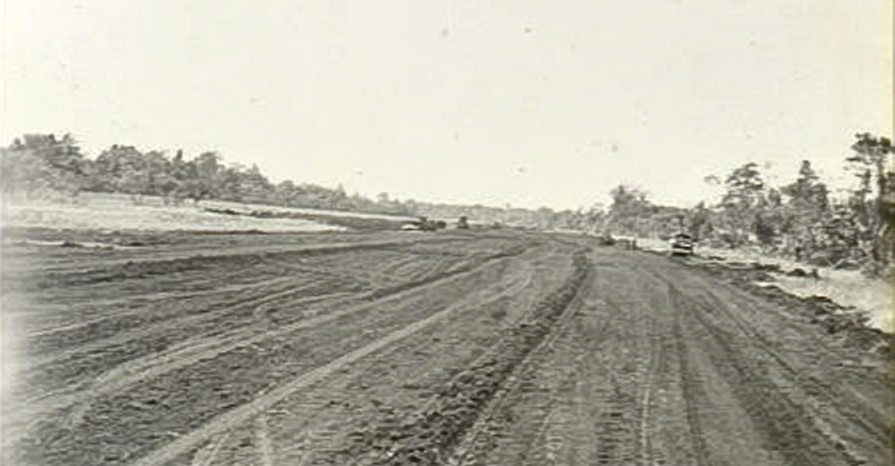
Construction of the airstrip at Tadji during World War II

The airport was built by the Japanese in 1942 and was seized by the Allies as a part of Operation Persecution during April 1944.

== Airlines and destinations ==
(no known scheduled services)
