= 80th Infantry Regiment (Imperial Japanese Army) =

The 80th Infantry Regiment (歩兵第80連隊 or 歩兵第八十連隊, Hohei Dai-80 Rentai) was an infantry regiment in the Imperial Japanese Army. The regiment was attached to the 40th Infantry Brigade of the 20th Division. It was organized on 18 April 1916 and its headquarters was established in December that year at Bodeok-dong, Keishōhoku Province (now North Gyeongsang Province). The regiment participated during the Second Sino-Japanese War and during the later stages of World War II, the regiment was in New Guinea, as part of the Japanese Eighteenth Army. They participated in a number of engagements, including the Battle of Finschhafen.

== Organization ==
- 1st Battalion
- 2nd Battalion
- 3rd Battalion

== Commanders ==
- Sadahiko Miyake (1940–1944)

== Works cited ==
- Tanaka, Kengoro (1980). Operations of the Imperial Japanese Armed Forces in the Papua New Guinea Theater During World War II. Tokyo, Japan: Japan Papua New Guinea Goodwill Society. OCLC 9206229.
