= Tadji, Papua New Guinea =

Town in Papua New Guinea

Coordinates: 3.151583°S 142.37777°E

Tadji is a small town on the north coast of Papua New Guinea in Aitape Urban ward of East Aitape Rural LLG, Sandaun Province. Tadji is located to the east of Aitape. The town is home to Tadji Airport, which was built by the Japanese in 1942 during the World War II. The liberation of Tadji was the focus of Operation Persecution during April 1944, when the Allies captured the airstrip.
