= Sadahiko Miyake =

- 三宅 貞彦
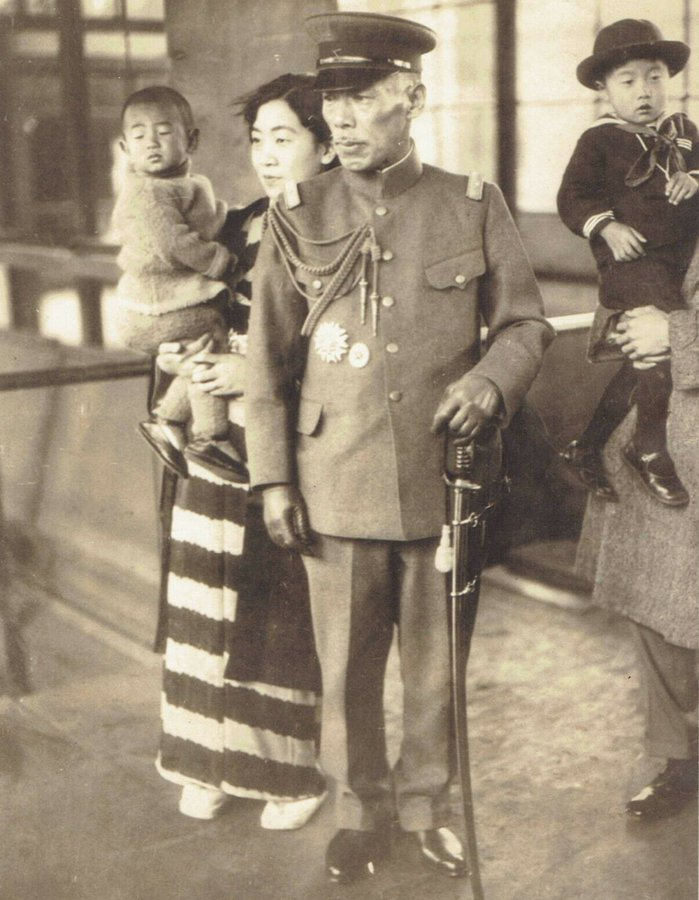
- Born: 18 March 1891; Okayama prefecture, Japan
- Died: 22 October 1956 (aged 65)
- Military career
- Allegiance: Empire of Japan
- Branch: Imperial Japanese Army
- Service years: 1912–1945
- Rank: Major General
- Conflicts: Second Sino-Japanese War; World War II

Sadahiko Miyake (三宅 貞彦, Miyake Sadahiko; 18 March 1891 – 22 October 1956) was a general in the Imperial Japanese Army, commanding Japanese ground forces on New Guinea during the closing months of the war.

== Biography ==
Miyake was born in Okayama prefecture. He graduated from the 24th class of the Imperial Japanese Army Academy in May 1912. In March 1939, he was promoted to colonel in the infantry and was appointed Chief of the Ordnance Section of the IJA 116th Division in 1939. This division was a new division which had been activated only a year earlier to reinforce the Central China Expeditionary Army during the Second Sino-Japanese War. In April 1940, Miyake was appointed Commanding Officer of the IJA 80th Infantry Regiment, a garrison force in Korea.

In January 1943, the IJA 80th Infantry was sent to New Guinea and participated in the Battle of Lae-Salamaua and other battles. Miyake was promoted to major general in March 1944. He returned to Japan as Commanding Officer of Okayama Regimental District in April: however, in May he was ordered back to New Guinea as command of the Infantry Group of the IJA 20th Division. Miyake was at the Battle of Finschhafen against the Australian Army between September and October 1943 during the Huon Peninsula campaign, but was forced to retreat after being defeated during the Battle of Sattelberg on 25 October 1943.

Miyake was later in command of "Miyake Force" operating in New Guinea, before surrendering at the end of World War II. He was released from prison on 1 March 1950.
