= Sio, Papua New Guinea =

Sio
- Location within Papua New Guinea
- Coordinates: 5°57′18.37″S 147°22′13.47″E
- Country: Papua New Guinea
- Province: Morobe Province

Languages
  - Main languages: Tok Pisin, English
- Time zone: UTC+10 (AEST)

Sio is a village on the north coast of Huon Peninsula, Papua New Guinea. It is located in Wasu Rural LLG, Morobe Province.

== History ==
A Lutheran mission station was established at Sio in 1910.

The town was occupied by Imperial Japanese forces during World War II and was a major operating base. During the Huon Peninsula campaign the town was wrestled from the defending elements of the Japanese 20th Division by the Australian 9th Division and the Papuan Infantry Battalion, during the Battle of Sio, fought between December 1943 and January 1944.
