= Landing at Aitape =

Battle of the Western New Guinea campaign of World War II

- Part of the New Guinea campaign
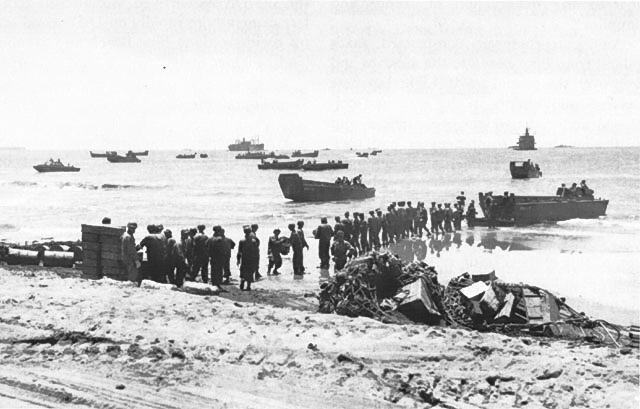
- Troops unloading supplies at Aitape
Date	22 April – 4 May 1944
Location	Aitape and Tadji Airstrips, Territory of New Guinea
Result	American victory

Belligerents
United States; Australia (naval)	Japan

Commanders and leaders
(United States) Douglas MacArthur (United States) Robert L. Eichelberger (United States) Walter Krueger (United States) Jens A. Doe	(Empire of Japan) Hatazō Adachi (Empire of Japan) Shigeru Katagiri

Units involved
(United States) 41st Infantry Division; 163rd Infantry Regiment; (United States) 32d Infantry Division; 127th Infantry Regiment	(Empire of Japan) 18th Army; 20th Division

Strength
22,500	1,000

Casualties and losses
19 killed 40 wounded	525 killed 25 captured

The Landing at Aitape (code-named Operation Persecution) was a battle of the Western New Guinea campaign of World War II. American and Allied forces undertook an amphibious landing on 22 April 1944 at Aitape on the northern coast of Papua New Guinea. The amphibious landing was undertaken simultaneously with the landings at Humboldt and Tanahmerah Bays to secure Hollandia to isolate the Japanese 18th Army at Wewak. Operations in the area to consolidate the landing continued until 4 May, although US and Japanese forces fought further actions in western New Guinea following a Japanese counter-offensive that lasted until early August 1944. Aitape was subsequently developed into an Allied base of operations and was used by Australian forces throughout late 1944 and into 1945 during the Aitape–Wewak campaign.

== Background ==
Aitape, located on the northern coast of the Territory of New Guinea about 125 miles (201 km) southeast of Hollandia, was occupied by the Japanese during December 1942. The Japanese built Tadji Airfield a few miles southeast near the coast. Throughout 1943 and early 1944, the Allies sought to isolate the main Japanese base around Rabaul. As the Allies began advancing towards the Philippines, the Allied South West Pacific Area Headquarters received intelligence reports that Aitape was only lightly garrisoned, and General Douglas MacArthur decided in March 1944 to invade Aitape in order to bypass the large Japanese garrisons at Hansa Bay and Wewak.

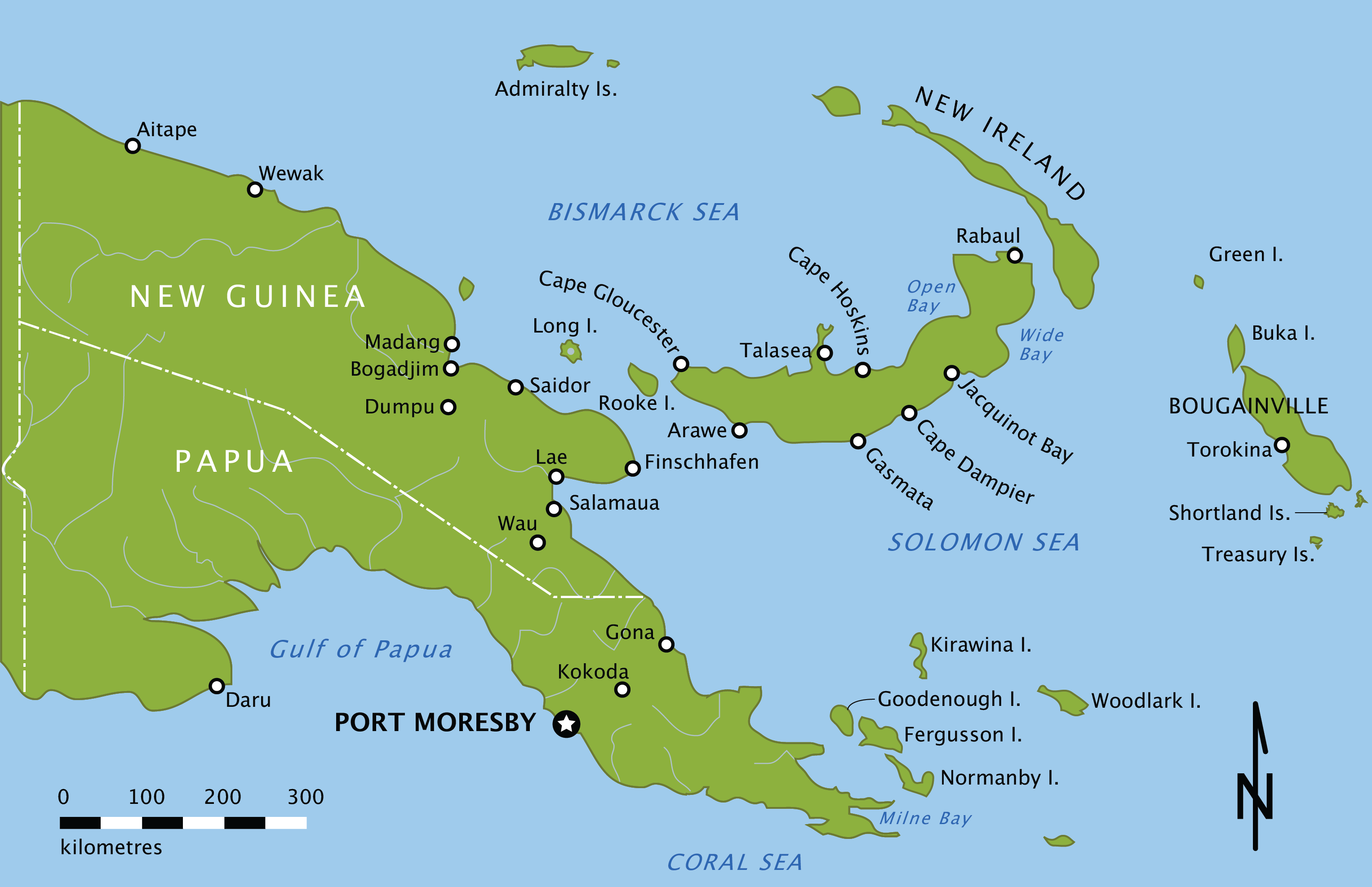
The New Guinea and New Britain area, including Aitape

The objective was to isolate the Japanese 18th Army, under General Hatazō Adachi at Wewak, which was home to the largest Japanese airbase in mainland New Guinea, so that they could provide flank protection against any westward movement by the Japanese 18th Army towards Hollandia, secure Tadji Airfield to provide support to the more important Hollandia landings after the carriers of Task Force 58 (TF 58) departed, and establish light naval facilities at Aitape to support further operations.

Operations Reckless and Persecution were supported by 217 ships, along with almost 23,000 personnel of all types of service units, to transport and protect the 52,000 men, their equipment, and supplies over 1,000 mi (1,600 km) to conduct the separate amphibious landings at Aitape and Hollandia deep in Japanese territory. Out of those 52,000 men, 22,500 were allocated to the landing at Aitape. Overall command of the Allied operation to secure Hollandia and Aitape was given to Lieutenant General Walter Krueger, commander of the Sixth United States Army, codenamed Alamo Force. Japanese troops around Aitape and Tadji Airstrip were thought to number about 3,500, including 1,500 combat troops of Shigeru Katagiri's 20th Division.

A naval bombardment, carried out by Task Force 58 led by Vice Admiral M. A. Mitscher, struck Japanese facilities at Sawar, Wadke Island, Hollandia and Sarmi on 21 and 22 April. This action served to clear away as much Japanese resistance as possible before landing the troops. Additionally, in direct support of the attack, the Eastern Attack Group (Task Group 77.3) was assigned under the command of Captain Albert G. Noble; this Task Group formed part of Rear Admiral Daniel E. Barbey's US and Australian Task Force 77, which was assigned to support landings at Aitape, Hollandia and Tanahmerah Bay. Eight escort carriers provided air support to the landing, while several squadrons of United States Army Air Force attack bombers were also allocated, or placed on standby to assist if needed. Naval gunfire support in the immediate vicinity of the landing beaches was provided by a force of five destroyers, nine high-speed transports and one Liberty Ship.

== Landings ==
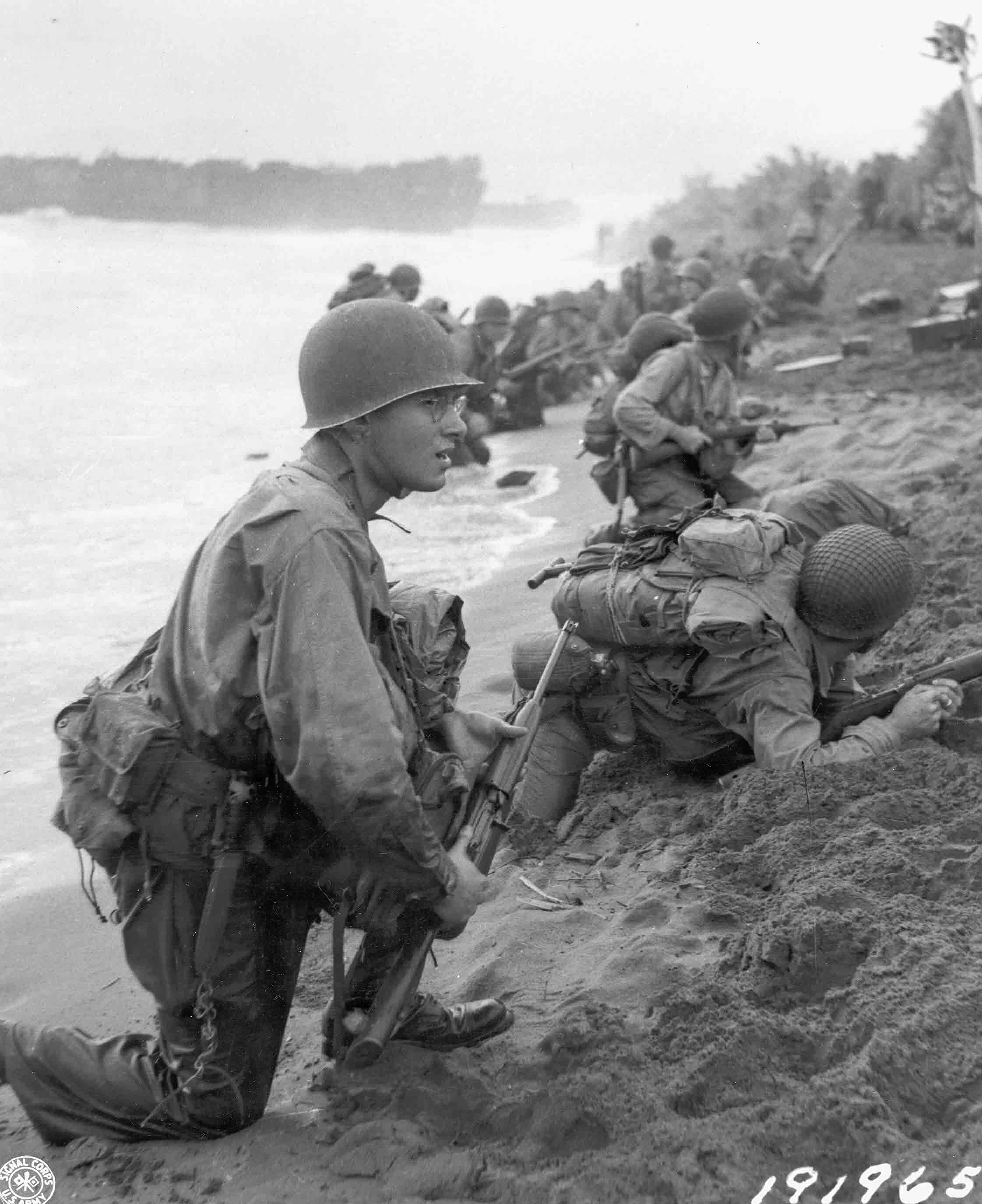
American soldiers landing on Blue Beach

The Allied ground force assigned to the landing at Aitape was commanded by Brigadier General Jens A. Doe and was built around the US 163rd Infantry Regiment of the 41st Infantry Division. Doe's command, designated the Reckless Task Force, was directly subordinate to Krueger's headquarters and was established at the same level as the Persecution Task Force under Lieutenant General Robert L. Eichelberger, which was assigned to capture Hollandia. Japanese troops turned out to be about 1,000 in the area, much less numerous than what was previously estimated, and mostly made up of antiaircraft artillerymen and service personnel. Only about 240 combat troops were in the area at the time.

The shipping and troops assigned to the operation by the Allies staged out of Cape Cretin in mid-April. Rehearsals were undertaken around Lae, before departure. As the Allied plan called for simultaneous landings at Aitape, Humboldt Bay and Tanahmerah Bay, the three forces rendezvoused near Manus Island on 20 April. Under the shared protection provided by Barbey's warships, the three convoys proceeded towards their objectives until early morning on 22 April when the Eastern Attack Group broke off from the convoy about 80 miles (130 km) from the New Guinea coast and proceeded southeast towards its objective around Aitape.

The landings were planned at "Blue Beach", a 1,200-yard (1,100 m) beach about 1 mile (1.6 km) from Tadji Airfield. Obscured by heavy smoke from fires from the beachhead, the crews of the landing craft became disorientated and came ashore at the wrong place, landing at Wapil on 22 April 1944. Two battalions of the 163rd Regimental Combat Team landed in nine waves against only light opposition Initially, the only resistance they encountered from consisted of only a few rifle shots, with most Japanese defenders fleeing into the hills as the overwhelming force continued to arrive.

After the beachhead had been secured, No. 62 Works Wing of the Royal Australian Air Force (RAAF) went ashore on the morning of 22 April to help secure and repair Tadji Airfield. MacArthur watched the landings from a light cruiser, then went ashore in a landing boat.

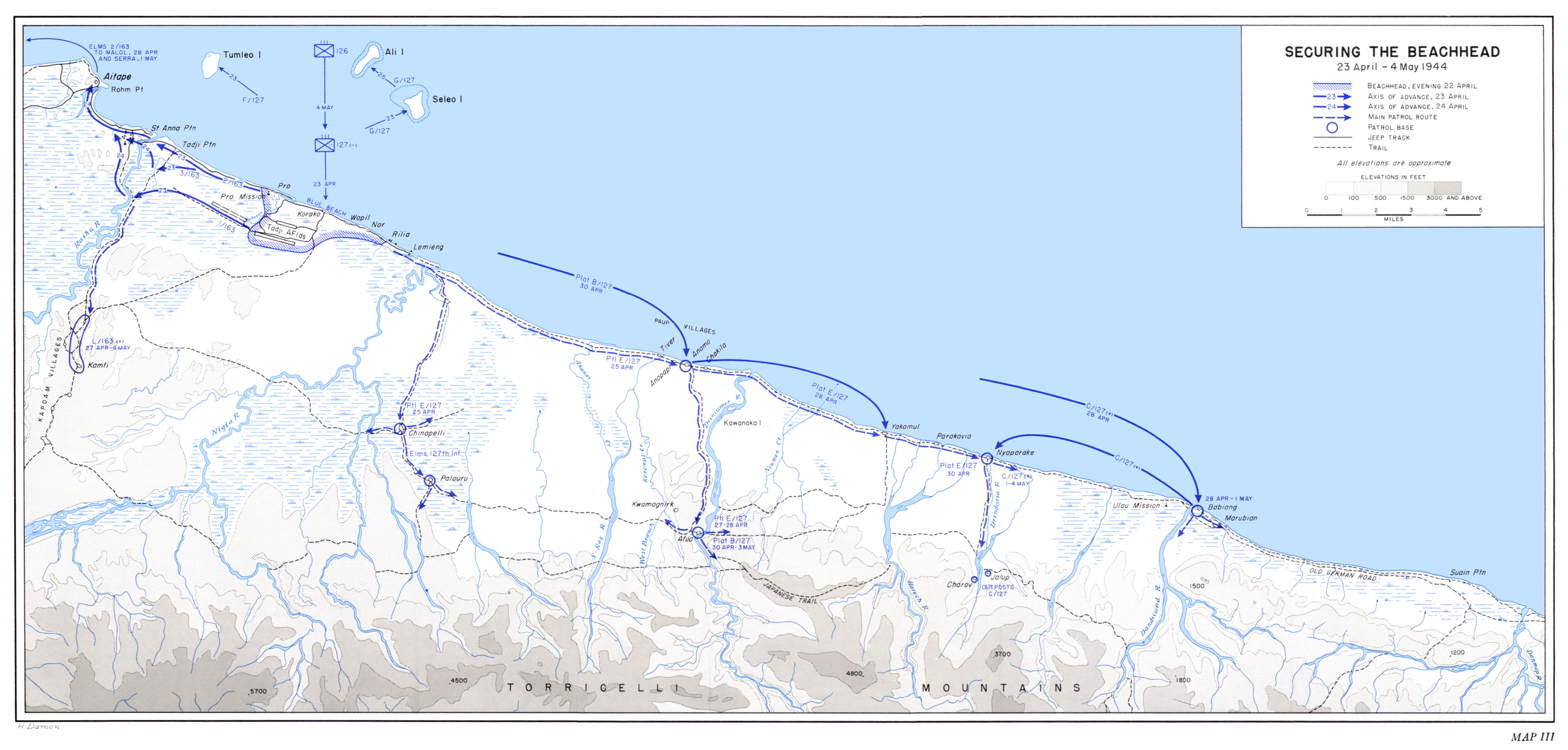
Map of the Aitape landing

The main airfield was secured by 13:00 on 22 April, and on 23 April, infantry secured incomplete Tadji west strip. The fighter strip was made operational by the RAAF No. 62 Works Wing within 48 hours after working nonstop. Twenty-five P-40s from the No. 78 Wing of the RAAF landed on the field on 24 April, with the rest of the wing arriving the next day to provide support to the Aitape and Hollandia landings. While securing areas westward of the airfield strip, the 163d Infantry Regiment did not encounter much resistance, only suffering two casualties, one man wounded and another missing. The second echelon of Allied troops arrived on 23 April, with the 127th Infantry Regiment arriving from the 32nd Infantry Division. The following day on 24 April, infantry and tanks proceeded further west, crossed the Raihu river without much resistance, reaching Aitap town and Rohm Point, which had been hastily abandoned by their Japanese defenders.

Allied troops then decided on going up the Raihu river, in order to hunt down remaining Japanese stragglers who hoped to go either east toward Wewak or west toward Vanimo, the closest strongholds still in Japanese hands. On 28 and 29 April, upon reaching Kamti village, around present day Paiawa, members of the 3rd Battalion encountered the only signs of organized Japanese resistance found in the Aitape area to 4 May. An estimated 200 Japanese launched a number of harassing attacks, resulting in heavy losses for them. The Japanese lost about 90 men while members of the 3rd Battalion only lost 3 men and 2 wounded. On 30 April the men at Kamti withdrew while Battery A, 126th Field Artillery Battalion, fired 240 rounds of 105 mm ammunition into the village and its environs. The next morning Company L, 163d Infantry Battalion, moved back to Kamti against no opposition. There were few further contacts with the Japanese on the west flank and all outposts of the 163d Infantry Battalion were relieved by 32d Division troops early in May.

== Aftermath ==
=== Casualties and analysis ===
Between 22 April and 4 May, Japanese casualties in the Aitape area were estimated at 525 killed, and during the same period 25 were captured. Allied losses were 19 killed and 40 wounded. All of these were American, and exception for two or three all were suffered by the 163d Infantry. During the operation, only one landing force transport was damaged by Japanese aircraft. The transport Etami was attacked by three Japanese torpedo bombers on 27 April. The vessel caught fire with a large amount of cargo on board, but the fire was brought under control and the ship towed to Finschhafen. Efforts to improve the second strip so that it could be used by bombers continued, and the strip ultimately was not ready until July.

The landings at Aitape, along those of Hollandia, effectively contributed to strengthening the Allied push toward western New Guinea and the Philippines, while successfully bypassing and cutting off large Japanese forces at Wewak. The area ultimately proved less suitable for the development of airbases than the Allies had assessed, and as a result Allied attention shifted further west towards the Geelvink Bay area, focusing on Wakde and Biak, which were secured in May.

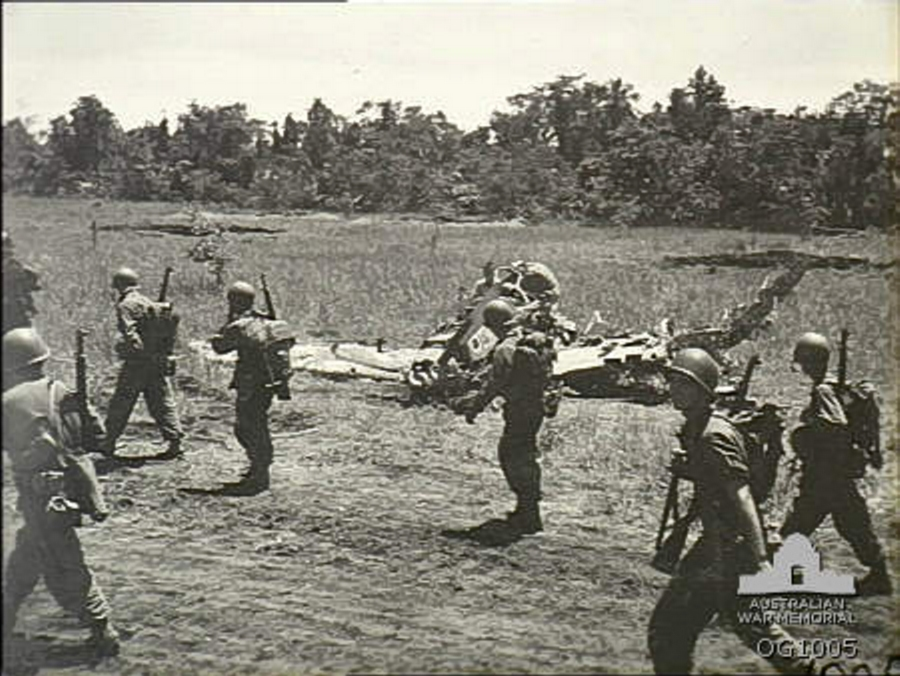
US infantry patrolling Taji Airstrip next to a destroyed Japanese aircraft

=== Subsequent operations ===
Following the securing of the perimeter around Aitape and Tadji Airfields, American troops of the 32d Infantry Division started probing Japanese forces east of Tadji Airfield, in case of a possible counterattack by the 18th Army, now cut off from western New Guinea, by setting up new outposts along the rivers leading to Wewak. Elements of the Japanese 20th Division started digging in between Babiang and the Danmap River around Suain during early May in order to slow down or stop a potential American push eastward. The expected attack was late to come. On 10 May, eight P-40s of No. 78 Wing, Royal Australian Air Force, now based at Taji Airfield bombed and strafed Japanese positions east of Babiang. On 12 May, members of 127th Infantry Regiment stumbled upon the first lines of Japanese defense, coming under heavy mortar and machine gun fire. However, they managed to fight back and progress several miles beyond the first Japanese defensive line along the old German road and through deep jungle forest located in between the road and the Torricelli Mountains, only to find out that the Japanese were much more numerous and organized than expected, and decided on pulling back on 14 May after heavy Japanese counterattacks.

The Japanese, growing increasingly concerned of this threat on their western flank, decided to act on by taking a more offensive stance. Between 15 May up until 5 June, under constant harassment and skirmishes, troops of the 127th Infantry Regiment decided to retreat first to Babiang which they had occupied five days before, only to be beaten back, driving them to flee to Nyaparake and Parakovio (the HQs of the Nyaparake Force), which turned out to be impossible to hold as well, and from which they had to depart on 24 May. Eventually, they made a last attempt at delaying the Japanese at Yakumol on 4 June, before being compelled to retreat by sea the following night under constant artillery shelling, relocating on a defensive line along the west bank of the Driniumor River. Several hundred Japanese and dozens of Americans died during those actions.

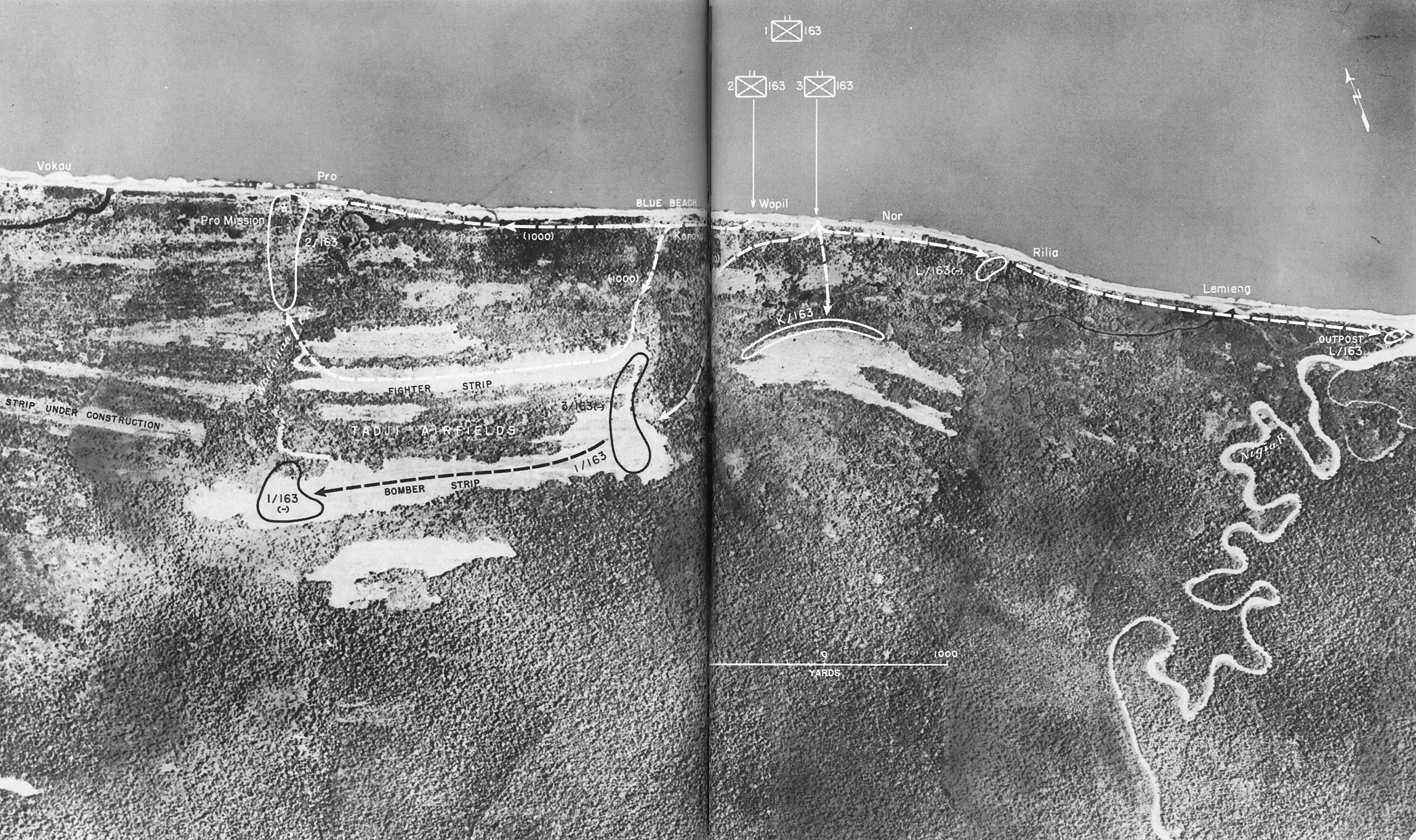
Before and after photographs of the Tadji Airstrips seized during the landings

Those constant and well organized attacks, along with intelligence provided by documents captured by AIB patrols at the end of May, indicated that the Japanese 18th Army, using 20th and 41st Divisions based at Wewak and its surroundings, were preparing something much bigger. Having broken Japanese codes earlier in the war, they found out that Adachi planned to retake Tadji Airfield, in order to delay the American forces push toward Western New Guinea and the Philippines.

During June, American forces started reinforcing their position at Anamo and Afua along the Driniumor River, with some patrols venturing eastward of the river to keep contact with the Japanese. The Japanese kept moving more troops from Wewak to the area, which would lead to the Battle of Driniumor River in July. Heavy fighting continued in the area continued throughout July and into early August, before the Japanese began withdrawing as they depleted their rations and supplies of artillery ammunition. The period between late April and early August resulted in heavier casualties than the original landing: 440 Allied soldiers were killed and 2,550 were wounded during this period, while 9,000 of the 20,000 Japanese soldiers committed to the fighting were lost. In November 1944, Australian forces took over from the US troops around Aitape, and from then until the end of the war in August 1945, began a limited campaign in the Aitape–Wewak area, utilizing Aitape as their base of operations as they advanced towards Wewak and into the Torricellis.
