= Shigeru Katagiri =

Imperial Japanese Army lieutenant general (1892-1944)

- 片桐 茂
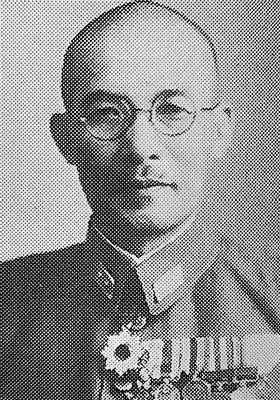
- Born: 18 March 1892; Kagawa, Japan
- Died: 28 April 1944 (aged 52); Wewak, New Guinea
- Education: Imperial Japanese Army Academy; Army Staff College
- Military career
- Allegiance: Empire of Japan
- Branch: Imperial Japanese Army
- Service years: 1913–1944
- Rank: Lieutenant general
- Units: IJA 11th Infantry Regiment, Imperial Japanese Army General Staff Office, Chosen Army, IJA 1st Division, Kwantung Army, Mongolia Garrison Army
- Commands: IJA 27th Cavalry Regiment; IJA 1st Cavalry Brigade; IJA 20th Infantry Division
- Conflicts: Second Sino-Japanese War; World War II; Huon Peninsula campaign; Battle of Finschhafen; Battle of Sattelberg; Battle of Hollandia †
- Other work: Instructor, aide-de-camp, military advisor

Shigeru Katagiri (片桐 茂, Katagiri Shigeru; 18 March 1892 – 28 April 1944) was a lieutenant general in the Imperial Japanese Army, commanding Japanese ground forces on New Guinea until his death during World War II.

== Biography ==
Katagiri was born in Kagawa Prefecture. He graduated from the 25th class of the Imperial Japanese Army Academy in May 1913 and was initially attached to the IJA 11th Infantry Regiment. He graduated from the 36th class of the Army Staff College in November 1924, and was subsequently assigned to the Imperial Japanese Army General Staff Office. From September 1926, Katagiri was assigned to the Chosen Army in Korea as head of a special military intelligence unit operating in Siberia and Manchuria. Afterwards, he returned to Tokyo as an instructor at the Army Academy and Staff College, as an aide-de-camp to Prince Mikasa, instructor at the Cavalry School, and commander of the IJA 27th Cavalry Regiment.

During the Second Sino-Japanese War, Katagiri was promoted to colonel in the cavalry in August 1937, and in November of the same year became chief of staff of the IJA 1st Division which was stationed in Manchukuo under the aegis of the Kwantung Army. Katagiri was promoted to major general in August 1939 and assigned command of the IJA 1st Cavalry Brigade the following month, operating with the Mongolia Garrison Army to December 1940, when he returned to Japan. He subsequently became military advisor to the Ministry of Agriculture and Forestry, and vice-bureau head for the Inspectorate of Cavalry.

In December 1942, Katagiri was promoted to lieutenant general. In July 1943, he was ordered to replace General Shigemasa Aoki, who had died of malaria while commanding the IJA 20th Division in New Guinea. His headquarters was near Gali, New Guinea, and marched with his troops 200 miles (320 km) to reinforce Finschhafen after the Australian landings. Katagiri was the primary Japanese commander at the Battle of Finschhafen between September and October 1943 in the Huon Peninsula campaign. He gathered his forces at Sattelberg but was forced to retreat after being defeated during the Battle of Sattelberg on 25 October 1943.

During the Battle of Hollandia at the end of April 1944, Katagiri was killed in combat while en route from Madang to Wewak.
