= David Whitehead (Australian Army officer) =

Australian Army officer

David Adie Whitehead
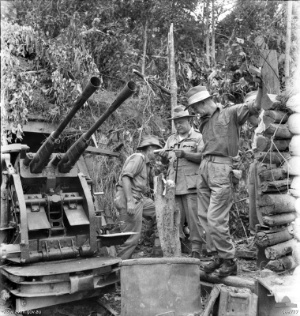
- Whitehead (right) with General Sir Thomas Blamey on Tarakan, 8 May 1945
- Born: 30 September 1896; Leith, Scotland
- Died: 23 October 1992 (aged 96); Kew, Australia
- Military career
- Allegiance: Australia
- Branch: Australian Army
- Service years: 1913–1954
- Rank: Brigadier
- Nickname: "Torpy"
- Service number: NX376
- Commands: 2nd Armoured Brigade (1947–52); 26th Brigade (1942–45); 2/32nd Battalion (1942); 2/2nd Machine Gun Battalion (1940–42); 1st Machine Gun Regiment (1937–40)
- Conflicts: First World War; Western Front; Second World War; North African Campaign; Second Battle of El Alamein; South West Pacific Theatre; Salamaua-Lae campaign; Huon Peninsula campaign; Battle of Tarakan
- Awards: Commander of the Order of the British Empire; Distinguished Service Order & Bar; Military Cross; Efficiency Decoration; Mentioned in Despatches (3); Croix de guerre (France)
- Other work: Combustion engineer, manager, member of the Conciliation and Arbitration Commission

Brigadier David Adie Whitehead, CBE, DSO & Bar, MC, ED (30 September 1896 – 23 October 1992) was an Australian Army officer who fought in both First and Second World Wars.

== Early life and First World War ==
Born on 30 September 1896 in Leith, Scotland, David Whitehead enlisted in the Australian Army as a cadet lieutenant in the Permanent Force on 1 September 1913. He received officer training at Royal Military College, Duntroon in Canberra and was commissioned as an officer on 4 April 1916. During his time at Duntroon, Whitehead earned the nickname of "Torpy", in reference to the Whitehead torpedo, and the sobriquet stuck with him for the remainder of his life. Upon graduation Whitehead was seconded to the Australian Imperial Force (AIF) in France where he commanded the 23rd Machine Gun Company from April 1917 until he was made adjutant of the 3rd Machine Gun Battalion in July 1918. He was awarded the Military Cross in September 1918 for leading a battery of eight machine guns under heavy fire during an attack in late August.

== Between the wars ==
With the war now over due to the armistice with Germany in November 1918, Whitehead left the full-time army after returning to Australia the following year, but continued to serve in the part-time Citizen Military Forces (CMF). He held a number of regimental positions, and was promoted to lieutenant colonel and command of the 1st Machine Gun Regiment in October 1937.

== Second World War ==
Following the outbreak of the Second World War, in September 1939, Whitehead enlisted in the Second Australian Imperial Force in March 1940 and was appointed the commander of the 2/2nd Machine Gun Battalion in May that year. He was given command of the 2/32nd Battalion in February 1942 and was promoted to brigadier in September and assumed command of the 26th Brigade. Whitehead led the brigade through the Second Battle of El Alamein during October and November that year in which it took part in heavy fighting.

After El Alamein, Whitehead and his brigade returned to Australia in early 1943 to participate in operations against the Japanese. The 26th Brigade took part in the Landing at Lae in September 1943 and the Huon Peninsula campaign from October 1943 to January 1944. Following these campaigns the brigade returned to Australia, and did not see action again until 1945. In May of that year Whitehead commanded the Australian landing at Tarakan. During this operation the 26th Brigade was expanded to almost the size of a division, and United States Army and Netherlands East Indies units served under Whitehead's command. Whitehead relinquished command of the 26th Brigade on 10 December 1945, by which time the war had come to an end, and returned to Australia two days later.

== Later life ==
Following the war, Whitehead returned to citizen soldiering and was commander of the CMF 2nd Armoured Brigade from November 1947. He also served as the aide de camp to the Governor General of Australia between January 1949 and May 1952 and commanded the CMF contingent which attended the coronation of Queen Elizabeth II between March and June 1953. Whitehead retired from the army in 1954. After leaving the military Whitehead worked as a manager at Shell between 1945 and 1956. From 1956 until his retirement in 1961 he was an arbitrator with the Conciliation and Arbitration Commission. David Whitehead died in 1992.
