= 79th Infantry Regiment (Imperial Japanese Army) =

The 79th Infantry Regiment was an infantry regiment in the Imperial Japanese Army. The regiment was attached to the 40th Infantry Brigade of the 20th Division. The regiment participated during the Second Sino-Japanese War and during the later stages of World War II, the regiment was in New Guinea, as part of the Japanese Eighteenth Army. They participated in a number of engagements, including the Battle of Finschhafen.

== Organization ==
- 1st Battalion
- 2nd Battalion
- 3rd Battalion

== Works cited ==
- Tanaka, Kengoro (1980). Operations of the Imperial Japanese Armed Forces in the Papua New Guinea Theater During World War II. Tokyo, Japan: Japan Papua New Guinea Goodwill Society. OCLC 9206229.
