= Sattelberg =

- Sattelberg, Papua New Guinea
- Coordinates: 6°29′11″S 147°46′00″E
- Country: Papua New Guinea
- Established: 1892
- Time zone: UTC+10 (AEST)

Sattelberg, also spelt Satelberg ("Saddle Mountain"), is a village on the Huon Peninsula, in Morobe Province, Papua New Guinea. The village is set on a peak about 900 metres (3,000 ft) above sea level, and dominates the area, with Finschhafen below. A Lutheran mission was founded by Johann Flierl in 1892, when the area was part of German New Guinea. As part of the settlement of World War I in 1919, responsibility for administering the territory was passed to Australia. In 1921, the Australian government gave permission for the German missionaries to remain, but placed the Lutheran Church of Australia in control of the mission. In the early 1930s, German influence was re-established as the Lutheran Church of Australia relinquished its control of the mission.

During World War II, the Japanese occupied the surrounding area in early 1942. Following the Australian landing at Finschhafen in October 1943, the bulk of the Japanese garrison at Finschhafen retreated to Sattelberg. As part of the Australian 9th Division's advance towards Sio, they captured the mission at Sattelberg in November in what has become known as the Battle of Sattelberg.
