= 20th Division (Imperial Japanese Army) =

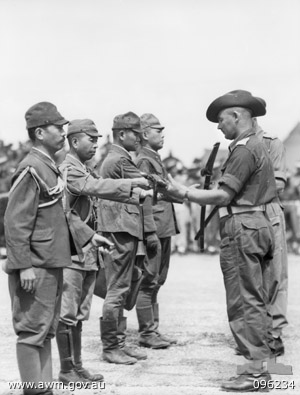
- Surrender of the IJA 18th Army at New Guinea
- Active: 24 December 1915 – 13 September 1945
- Country: Empire of Japan
- Branch: Imperial Japanese Army
- Type: Infantry
- Garrison/HQ: Yongsan, Korea
- Nickname: Morning Division
- Engagements: Second Sino-Japanese War; World War II

Commanders
- Notable commanders: Masutaro Nakai

The 20th Division (第20師団, Dai-nijū Shidan) was an infantry division in the Imperial Japanese Army. Its tsūshōgō code name was the Morning Division (朝兵団, Asa Heidan).

== Formation ==
The 20th Division and the 19th Division were both raised as a garrison force for Korea. After Japan's victory in the Russo-Japanese War of 1904–1905, and subsequent occupation, and then annexation of Korea in 1910, the need was felt for a dedicated garrison force, raised from people with local knowledge. The 20th Division was stationed in central Korea, in what is now Yongsan District, Seoul. The division received its colors on 24 December 1915; however, the division was not considered combat-ready until 1918, and divisional headquarters were co-located with the division only from 1 April 1919. The delay was due to limited funding available for the division to build its facilities in Korea and the need to recruit and train personnel from mainland Japan. The first commander of the 19th Division was Lieutenant General Tachibana Koichirō.

== Action ==
After the Mukden Incident on 18 September 1931, the 39th brigade of 20th Division was detached, reinforced by the 29th Infantry Regiment and stationed in the Liaodong Peninsula at Jinzhou. In December 1931, the rest of division has loso moved to Jinzhou. The whole 20th division was withdrawn in April 1932. However, following the Marco Polo Bridge Incident from 11 July 1937, the division was again dispatched to the north China theater of operations under the command of Lieutenant General Bunzaburō Kawagishi, as part of the 1st army. The division participated in the Beiping–Hankou Railway Operation and Battle of Taiyuan, but returned to its base at Keijo without having seen significant combat and remained as a reserve and garrison force in Korea throughout the remainder of Second Sino-Japanese War, mainly intended to counter an expected Soviet deep operation advances. From the start of the war until its return to Japan in January 1940, the 20th Division suffered 4,742 killed, 686 dead from illnesses, and 13,307 wounded.

On 1 July 1940, the reconnaissance regiment replaced the cavalry regiment, which was detached in 1942. Also, on 16 July 1941, the 77th infantry regiment was detached and transferred to the newly created 30th division, thus converting the 20th division to the triangular division format. In 1942, the division was sent to southern Manchukuo, and its field artillery regiment was changed to a mountain artillery regiment.

During the fighting in New Guinea, the division consisted of three infantry regiments—78th, 79th and 80th—along with the 26th Field Artillery Regiment. the 20th Reconnaissance Regiment, the 20th Engineer Regiment and the 20th Transport Regiment.

From October 1943, the 20th Infantry Division under Lieutenant General Shigemasa Aoki, was transferred to the Japanese Eighteenth Army in the Southern Area Command (New Guinea). Aoki died of malaria in July 1943, and was replaced by Lieutenant General Shigeru Katagiri, who established his headquarters near Gali, and marched with his troops 200 miles (320 km) to reinforce Finschhafen after the Allied landings at Lae and Nadzab on 4 September 1943. Katagiri was the primary Japanese commander at the Battle of Finschhafen between September and October 1943 in the Huon Peninsula campaign. He gathered his forces at Sattelberg but was forced to retreat after being defeated during the Battle of Sattelberg on 25 October 1943.

During the Battle of Hollandia at the end of April 1944, Shigeru Katagiri was killed in combat while en route from Madang to Wewak. He was replaced by Major General Masutaro Nakai, who was promoted to lieutenant general in April 1945. The surviving forces of the Nakai Detachment of the 20th division held out against the Australian Army in the Markham, Ramu and Finisterre campaigns and other combat operations in New Guinea until the end of the war. Of the approximately 25,000 men in the 20th Division, only 1,711 survived the war. More men died in New Guinea from malaria and malnutrition than from combat with the Americans or Australians.

== See also ==
- List of Japanese Infantry Divisions
