= Eighteenth Army (Japan) =

Japanese Eighteenth Army
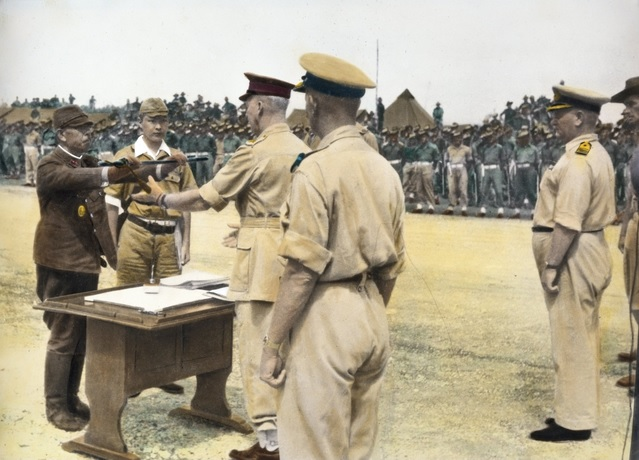
- General Adachi surrendering
- Active: November 9, 1942 – August 15, 1945
- Country: Empire of Japan
- Branch: Imperial Japanese Army
- Type: Infantry
- Role: Corps
- Garrison/HQ: New Guinea
- Nicknames: Mō (猛, Fierce)
- Engagements: New Guinea campaign

The Japanese 18th Army (第18軍, Dai-jyūhachi gun) was a army corps of the Imperial Japanese Army during World War II.

== History ==
The Japanese 18th Army was formed on November 9, 1942, under the Japanese Eighth Area Army of the Southern Expeditionary Army Group for the specific task of opposing landings by Allied forces in Japanese-occupied New Guinea. Upon establishment, it was made up of three divisions: the 20th, which had been raised from men from Kyushu, and the 41st and 51st Divisions formed from the Kantō region.

=== New Guinea campaign ===
Both the 20th and 41st Divisions arrived in New Guinea safely. However, the 51st Division, including the army's commander, Hatazō Adachi, and his senior staff, came under Allied air attack while en route from their supply base at Rabaul to Lae, in the Battle of the Bismarck Sea. All eight transport ships and four destroyers were sunk with the loss of 3,664 men, and only 2,427 men of the division were rescued.

Operation Cartwheel, an Allied master plan implemented from mid-1943, progressively severed the supply lines between Rabaul and frontline Japanese forces. Key defeats included the withdrawal of the Imperial Japanese Navy from the Solomon Islands campaign, followed by landings on New Britain, as well as Aitape and Hollandia, in April 1944.

Adachi's forces were badly affected by tropical diseases including malaria, heat exhaustion and malnutrition for the remainder of the war, despite Adachi's efforts to achieve some form of self-sufficiency by planting crops and giving priority in rations to the sick. As ammunition began to run low, many of Japanese field commanders resorted to banzai charges, rather than surrender.

By the end of the war in September 1945, most of his forces had been annihilated. Of Adachi's original 140,000 men, barely 13,000 were still alive when the war ended. The remnants of the Japanese 18th Army surrendered to the Australian 6th Division at Cape Wom, by Wewak, New Guinea. They were held on Mushu Island before being returned to Japan.

== List of Commanders ==
	Name	From	To
Commanding officer	Lieutenant General Hatazō Adachi	9 November 1942	15 August 1945
Chief of Staff	Lt. General Kane Yoshihara	9 November 1942	15 August 1945
