= Battle of Finschhafen =

1943 battle in the Huon Peninsula campaign of WWII

- Part of the Pacific War of World War II
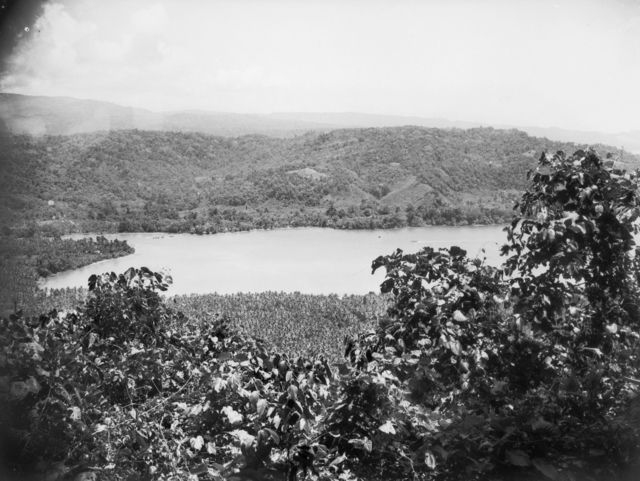
- A view of Finschhafen, October 1943
| Date | 22 September – 24 October 1943 |
| Location | Finschhafen area, Morobe Province, Territory of New Guinea 6°36′S 147°51′E |
| Result | Allied victory |

Belligerents
| Australia; United States | Japan |

Commanders and leaders
| (Australia) George Wootten (Australia) Victor Windeyer | Hatazo Adachi; Eizo Yamada; Shigeru Katagiri |

Units involved
| (Australia) 9th Division: 20th Infantry Brigade; 24th Infantry Brigade; 22nd Infantry Battalion; (United States) 532nd Engineer Boat and Shore Regiment | (Empire of Japan) 20th Division: 79th Infantry Regiment; 80th Infantry Regiment; 26th Field Artillery Regiment; 7th Naval Base Force; (Empire of Japan) 41st Division: 238th Infantry Regiment; (Empire of Japan) 51st Division: 102nd Infantry Regiment; (Empire of Japan) 1st Shipping Group |

Strength
| ~5,300 (first phase) | 4,000 – 5,000 (first phase); ~ 12,000 (second phase) |

Casualties and losses
| 73 killed, 285 wounded (first phase); 49 killed, 179 wounded (second phase) | 679 killed, 821 wounded (second phase only) |

The Battle of Finschhafen was part of the Huon Peninsula campaign in New Guinea during World War II and was fought between Australian and Japanese forces. The fighting took place between 22 September and 24 October 1943 following the landing at Scarlet Beach, which was followed by a two-pronged advance on Finschhafen as the Australian 20th Infantry Brigade advanced on the town from the north, while the 22nd Infantry Battalion drove from the south, having advanced from the landing beaches east of Lae. After the capture of Finschhafen, the Japanese forces in the area withdrew towards Sattelberg where they sought to hold the Australians before launching a counteroffensive, which subsequently threatened the landing beach. This attack was repelled by Australian and American forces, with heavy casualties being inflicted on the Japanese. In the aftermath, the Australians went on the offensive, capturing Sattelberg, and then advancing towards the Wareo plateau.

== Background ==
Finschhafen had been occupied by the Imperial Japanese Army on 10 March 1942 as part of strategic moves to provide protection to Lae, which they had established as an important air base. Throughout early 1943, the Allies had begun offensive operations in the Salamaua area of New Guinea and following the landing at Nadzab and capture of Lae in early September 1943, the Allies attempted to exploit their success with an advance to Finschhafen to begin the Huon Peninsula campaign.

The operation to capture Finschhafen was important to capture the western cape of the Vitiaz Strait for the construction of airfields and naval facilities for the upcoming New Britain campaign as part of Operation Cartwheel. The responsibility for securing the Huon Peninsula was assigned to Major General George Wootten's Australian 9th Division. On 22 September, the Australian 20th Infantry Brigade, under the command of Brigadier Victor Windeyer, supported by artillery from the 2/12th Field Regiment, as well as a field company of engineers and a field ambulance, had landed at Scarlet Beach – about 10 kilometres (6.2 mi) north of Finschhafen – and proceeded to establish a beachhead there. At the same time, the 22nd Infantry Battalion, an Australian Militia unit that had landed east of Lae in early September to relieve the troops holding the beachhead, began pursuing the Japanese that were withdrawing to the east, marching from Hopoi Mission Station towards Finschhafen, with a view to placing pressure on the Japanese southern flank.

The Japanese had expected an Allied assault on the Finschhafen region from around late July 1943, having appreciated its significance in relation to the Vitiaz and Dampier Straits. The Japanese Eighteenth Army commander, Lieutenant General Hatazo Adachi, had begun moving forces into the region. The majority of these were drawn from the 20th Division, which dispatched a force of about 2,800 men from Madang in August. These forces consisted of the 80th Infantry Regiment, one battalion of the 26th Field Artillery Regiment, and the 7th Naval Base Force. In addition, following the fall of Lae, elements of the 41st Division – primarily the 238th Infantry Regiment – and the 51st Division's 102nd Infantry Regiment, were also moved to the area, and were placed under the command of Major General Eizo Yamada, commander of the 1st Shipping Group. The total number of Japanese in the area was around 4,000 to 5,000, although Allied intelligence estimated a strength of between 350 and 2,100.

Yamada's forces were spread out in a series of outposts that were orientated around a main defensive position established at Sattelberg, an abandoned Lutheran mission situated atop a 975-metre (3,199 ft) mountain that dominated the terrain about 12 kilometres (7.5 mi) north-west of Finschhafen. The Japanese forces lacked transportation and the road network had not been fully developed. They were low on ammunition for all calibres of weapons, especially artillery, and the majority of stores had to be carried by combat troops, as local carriers had ceased working for the Japanese in response to Allied propaganda. Following the landing at Scarlet Beach, Yamada was ordered to launch an attack on the Australian forces in order to delay them so that further reinforcements could arrive from the 20th Division.

== Battle ==
=== Australian drive on Finschhafen ===
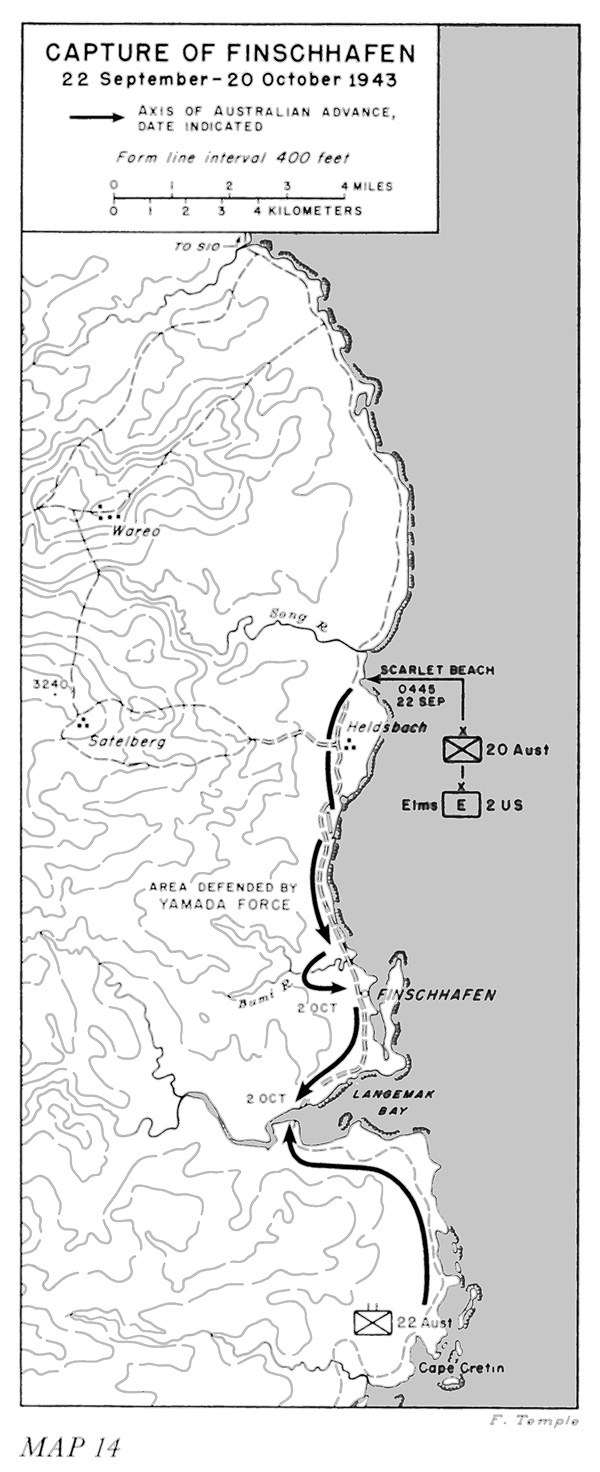
Map showing the capture of Finschhafen

After the landing, the Australians began establishing a beachhead several kilometres deep, during which significant actions were fought around Siki Cove and Katika. Late in the day, a large Japanese air raid struck the Allied fleet off shore, but this was eventually defeated by a strong US fighter umbrella that was forewarned by Allied picket ships. The following day, 23 September, the 20th Brigade's drive on Finschhafen began, with two battalions commencing the advance south – the 2/13th and 2/15th supported by the 2/12th Field Regiment as well as engineers from the 2/3rd Field Company – while the 2/17th was split up, with two companies advancing as part of the brigade's reserve, while another remained to secure the beachhead from a Japanese attack and push it further to the north, and the fourth pushed towards Sattelberg. The 2/3rd Pioneer Battalion remained in the beachhead, working to improve roads, while the 2/8th Field Ambulance set up a main dressing station, which would receive casualties as they were evacuated rearwards from the advanced dressing station that was following the battalions advancing south.

In addition to having to split their forces, the Australians also suffered from supply difficulties during the advance. The terrain over the southerly approaches was quite difficult being primarily dense jungle with numerous water crossings and rugged features. To traverse the ground, the Australians had only limited vehicles, with each infantry battalion possessing four jeeps with trailers for resupply, while the engineers and artillery had several trucks and tractors. The local population, which might have been employed to carry stores, had abandoned the Japanese due to Allied propaganda and their services were also unavailable to the Allies at the initial stages of the campaign. As a result, a large amount of stores had to be carried by combat soldiers, who were diverted to the task. Nevertheless, the Australian advance succeeded in capturing the Heldsbach plantation and the nearby airfield. It continued until the Australians came up against strong resistance around the Bumi River. There a force of around 300 Japanese sailors and marines from the 85th Naval Garrison, reinforced by elements of the 238th Infantry Regiment, established themselves in a blocking position. Although they were under orders to conform to the overall Japanese plan of delaying the Australians and then withdrawing towards Sattelberg to carry out a containment operation, the commander of the naval troops resolved to hold the position, and they subsequently held up the Australian advance on 26 September, until they were overcome through an attack on their flanks by the 2/15th Infantry Battalion.

In response to concerns about the large number of Japanese forces in the area, which had proven to be in larger numbers than Allied intelligence had estimated, Windeyer requested reinforcements. These were initially refused as US naval commanders baulked at the idea of transporting another brigade to Finschhafen due to the risks involved and potential naval losses that might be incurred. In addition, the Allied higher headquarters under General Douglas MacArthur was operating under the mistaken belief that the Japanese defending the area were only very small in number, when in actuality the two forces were roughly equal in size, with the Allied strength after the landing being around 5,300. After much discussion amongst Australian and US commands on 29/30 September the 2/43rd Infantry Battalion arrived to relieve the 2/17th. The South Australians from the 2/43rd were subsequently tasked with defending the beachhead and the surrounding areas including the Heldsbach area, and were ordered to prepare for further actions around Sisi and Sattelberg. Heavy rain fell around this time, and the Australian brigade commander was compelled to use combat troops to carry stores forward from the landing zone to the forward areas as motor transport was unable to transit the primitive track system. Due to concerns about their western flank, the 2/17th extended the Australian perimeter towards Jivevaneng, establishing a company there, but it subsequently came under attack on the Sattelberg Road and west of Katika on 25 and 26 September from the Japanese 80th Infantry Regiment, which was trying to break through to the Heldsbach Plantation on the coast. Over the course of several days, the company from the 2/17th around Jivevaneng held off six Japanese attacks until relieved by the 2/43rd Infantry Battalion on 30 September.

Meanwhile, concerned about their rear, due to the presence of a large number of Japanese troops around Sattelberg, the Australians pushed cautiously to Kakakog, which saw heavy fighting at the end of the month, resulting in around 100 Japanese casualties as the Australians called in artillery fire and air attacks to soften up the Japanese defences prior to an attack by the 2/13th Infantry Battalion, supported by Vickers machine guns from the 2/15th. From the south, the 22nd Infantry Battalion advanced north against limited opposition. On 1 October, they crossed the Mape River adjacent to Langemak Bay, while the forward troops from the 20th Infantry Brigade, overwhelmed a Japanese force around Kakakog, supported by artillery and air power, killing between 80 and 100 defenders. Following this, the Japanese began withdrawing from Finschhafen and the next day, the 20th Infantry Brigade reached their objective, entering Finschhafen in the afternoon after overcoming limited resistance. The two forces married up the following day as troops from the 2/17th contacted the 22nd.

This ended the first phase of the battle. During operations to capture Finschhafen, the Australians lost 73 killed, 285 wounded. Sickness also resulted in a further 391 evacuations. Japanese casualties were reported as "heavy", but Allied intelligence assessed that a large number of Japanese forces remained at large and had withdrawn west away from the coast in preparation for further fighting. In the same time, US forces from the 532nd Engineer Boat and Shore Regiment lost eight killed and about 42 wounded, mainly during the landing operations around Scarlet Beach.

=== Japanese counterattack ===
Following the capture of Finschhafen, the main part of the Australian 20th Infantry Brigade returned to Scarlet Beach, due to intelligence that the Japanese were about to attack. The 2/13th and 22nd Infantry Battalions were left around Finschhafen, while the 2/15th and 2/17th Infantry Battalions were re-orientated to defend the approaches to Scarlet Beach. Around Jivevaneng, 5 kilometres (3.1 mi) east of Sattelberg, the 2/43rd had taken up a blocking position and in the early days of October fought a Japanese attack by a battalion from the 80th Infantry Regiment along the coast road to a halt. In an effort to shore up their western flank, the Australian 2/17th Infantry Battalion pressed towards Kumawa, which was met with a fierce response from the Japanese on 5 October when their line of communication from the west was threatened. The battalion continued to fight around Jivevaneng, and on 10 October they secured a piece of high ground called the "Knoll" by the Australians, who subsequently defeated 12 attacks to take it back.

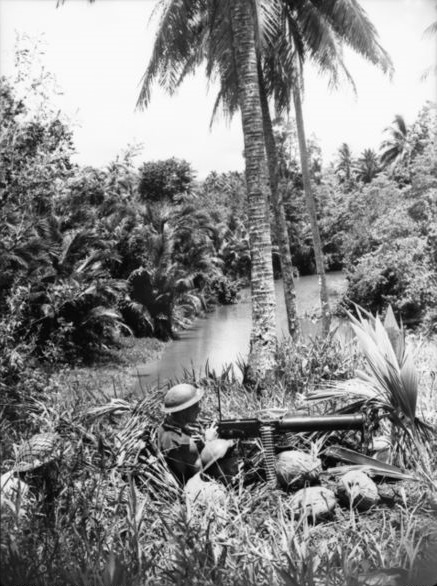
A machine gun team from the Australian 2/2nd Machine Gun Battalion around Scarlet Beach, October 1943

On 10/11 October, as it became apparent to the Allies that Japanese were preparing for a major assault, Wootten and his headquarters landed at Finschhafen, along with the remainder of Brigadier Bernard Evans' 24th Infantry Brigade. That day, the bulk of the Japanese 20th Division, under Shigeru Katagiri, arrived in the area, as the size of the Japanese force facing the Australians increased to 12,000; nevertheless, Katagiri decided to hold off on launching his counterattack until stores and ammunition could be stockpiled in sufficient quantities. Meanwhile, the Australian 24th Infantry Brigade was subsequently given responsibility for defence-in-depth around the Heldsbach Plantation and Arndt Point, while the 20th Infantry Brigade defended around the Sattelberg Road and the Mape River, with the 22nd Infantry Battalion on their southern flank around Dreger Harbour. As troops from the 20th Infantry Brigade attempted to push towards Sattelberg, the 24th began patrol actions towards Bonga; during one of these patrols, the Allies gained a significant intelligence boon when they discovered a Japanese briefcase containing an operational order detailing plans for a coming counterattack; in addition, the Allies intercepted several Japanese radio transmissions, and deduced their intentions based upon reports of troop and ship movements. This allowed the Australians to switch to a defensive strategy instead of continuing to push on towards Sattelberg.

The main Japanese counterattack began on 16 October, signalled by a large bonfire on Sattelberg. The attack was conceptualised as a three-pronged action, involving a diversionary attack by elements of the 79th Infantry Regiment to the north from Bonga, a company-level attack on Scarlet Beach from the sea by elements of the 79th with the Sugino Craft Raiding Unit, and a drive from Sattelberg by the remainder of the 79th and 80th Infantry Regiments orientated upon two lines of advance: one towards Scarlet Beach, conforming with the Song River, and the other striking towards Heldsbach advancing astride the Sattelberg Road. If successful, it was intended that following a regrouping, the two infantry regiments would then clear Finschhafen and Langemak Bay, but Japanese plans went awry from the beginning.

The northern diversion was easily overcome, and failed to confuse the Australians into committing their reserves, while the central drive was launched too early – in fact the day before the assault was scheduled to begin – consequently undermining Japanese attempts to achieve sufficient weight of forces to overcome the defenders. The seaborne landing also suffered a significant setback when more than half of the seven landing craft were destroyed by PT-128 and PT-194 on the night of 8/9 October while on their way to the landing beach. They subsequently suffered heavy casualties during the assault around the beach, with US and Australian troops there mounting a stubborn defence. The beach was guarded by a Bofors 40 mm gun of the 10th Light Anti-Aircraft Battery, 2-pounder anti-tank guns and machine guns of the 2/28th, and two 37 mm guns and two .50-calibre machine guns manned by the US 532nd Engineer Boat and Shore Regiment. One of the .50 calibre machine guns, manned by Private Nathan van Noy, assisted by Corporal Stephen Popa, engaged a group of Japanese led by a bugler and two men with flame-throwers. A Japanese hand grenade landed in their weapon pit, shattering one of van Noy's legs and wounding Popa, but they continued to fire. Another Japanese grenade silenced them. Van Noy was subsequently awarded the Medal of Honor.

The Australians managed to hold key terrain around Jivevaneng and Katika from where the Allies employed their direct and indirect fire support to inflict heavy casualties. Nevertheless, the Japanese achieved a degree of tactical success, albeit briefly. On 18 October, a party of Japanese broke through to Siki Cove, where Australian anti-aircraft gunners and artillerymen were forced to fire over "open sights" and fight back with small arms, after coming under fire from troops that had gotten under the guns. That night, the Japanese cut the 2/17th Infantry Battalion's supply route, establishing a road block astride the Jivevaneng–Sattelberg road, and cutting off the Australians defending Jivevaneng. The 2/17th and a number of other Australian units, such as most of the 2/3rd Pioneer Battalion, as well as part of the 2/28th, became isolated behind Japanese lines. In order to keep them supplied, emergency air drops of ammunition were flown in by pilots of No. 4 Squadron RAAF. Presented with the ambiguity of the situation, the commander of the 2/3rd Pioneer Battalion withdrew one of his outposts, while Brigadier Bernard Evans, commander of the 24th Infantry Brigade, also contracted his position around the beachhead, and in doing so subsequently granted the Japanese the prime position of Katika. The Australian divisional commander, Wootten, was enraged by the decision and subsequently lambasted his commander via radio. In response, the 2/13th Infantry Battalion detached two companies from rear area security and sent them north, while the 2/28th Infantry Battalion launched a counterattack against the Japanese around Katika, which – supported by artillery – successfully regained the position.

Nevertheless, largely the fighting went in favour of the Allies, and finally the Japanese assault ground to a halt. Despite forcing a contraction of the Australian forces defending the beachhead, on 21 October the Japanese withdrew from Siki Cove, although the fighting around Katika continued for four more days as the Japanese attempted to retake it. Fierce resistance from the 2/28th halted them and eventually the attack was called off on 24 October, with the Japanese having suffered heavily due to tactical deficiencies, poor co-ordination and operational security, and a lack of artillery. Meanwhile, the Allied response was hampered by poor working relationships at some of the highest levels between Australian and US commanders – particularly between I Corps commander Lieutenant General Edmund Herring and the VII Amphibious Force commander Rear Admiral Daniel E. Barbey – the lack of a unified command structure, over cautiousness amongst naval staff, and a poor appreciation of overall Japanese strength and intentions by the highest level of the Allied command who failed to send reinforcements until it was almost too late. Casualties during the attack amounted to at least 679 Japanese killed with another 821 estimated as wounded, while the Australians lost 49 killed and 179 wounded.

== Aftermath ==
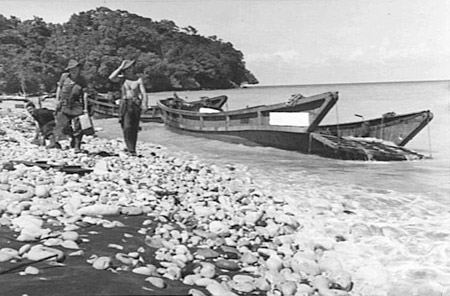
Wrecked Japanese barges at Scarlet Beach following a failed Japanese attack, 17 October 1943

Following the conclusion of the fighting around Finschhafen and the defeat of the Japanese counterattack, the Allies began preparing for a concerted assault on the Japanese main defensive position around Sattelberg. In the wake of the Japanese counterattack, the members of the Australian and American staff began working more closely together and reinforcements were quickly approved in the form of the 26th Infantry Brigade, under the command of Brigadier David Whitehead, as well as a squadron of Matilda tanks from the 1st Tank Battalion – whose presence the Australians sought to keep secret for as long as possible – which were landed at Langemak Bay. Supplies were landed by US troops from the 532nd Engineer Boat and Shore Regiment, and then brought up and cached around Jivevaneng and Kumawa, but heavy rain hampered the Australian efforts until mid-November.

The Australians subsequently were able to reduce and then secure the Japanese strong hold around Sattelberg against determined resistance following a hard slog through dense jungle, working in concert with the Matilda tanks. Elsewhere, further actions were planned, with the 7th Division preparing to advance through the Markham and Ramu Valleys as part of the inland advance towards Shaggy Ridge and then the north coast, in order to cut off the Japanese withdrawal route from the Huon Peninsula. This drive would ultimately be unsuccessful in preventing the bulk of the Japanese forces on the Huon Peninsula from escaping. At the same time, once Sattelberg was secured, a simultaneous drive was undertaken to clear the Wareo plateau, which provided good observation towards Scarlet Beach as well as serving as a junction for Japanese lines of communication south. Once Wareo was secure, the Allies advanced along the coast towards Sio, while US forces landed at Saidor to follow up the withdrawing Japanese. Nevertheless, the US and Australian forces would come up against the same forces throughout the remainder of the war around Madang and Aitape–Wewak.

Finschhafen was subsequently developed into "one of the largest bases in the Southwest Pacific area" according to Garth Pratten. Throughout 1944, the base saw considerable development with the establishment of a staging camp that had a divisional capacity, a wharf, ramps for tank landing ships LSTs ramps and piers. In addition, several airfields were established capable of hosting both fighter and bomber aircraft, as well as several fuel dumps. From Finschhafen, the Allies were able to project air power towards the main Japanese base at Rabaul, and seal off the Vitiaz and Dampier Straits. In addition, the base became an important logistics hub, playing an important role in supplying the American war machine as it advanced through the Philippines in 1944–1945.

In 1961, the battle honour "Finschhafen" was awarded to the Australian Army units that had been involved in the capture of Finschhafen. Covering the period 22 September to 8 December 1943, it includes the capture of Scarlet Beach, the Defence of Scarlet Beach, and the fighting for Sattelberg, although separate battle honours were also awarded for these actions.

== Bibliography ==
- Australian Military Forces (1944). Reconquest: An Official Record of the Australian Army's Successes in the Offensives Against Lae, Finschhafen, Markham and Ramu Valleys, Huon Peninsula, Finisterre Mountains, Rai Coast, Bogadjim, Madang, Alexishafen, Karkar Is., Hansa Bay September, 1943 – June, 1944 (PDF). The Australian Army at War. Melbourne, Victoria: Director General of Publication Relations. OCLC 5308007. Archived from the original on 16 February 2015.
- Casey, H. J., ed. (1959). Volume IV: Amphibian Engineer Operations. Engineers of the Southwest Pacific 1941–1945. Washington, DC: Government Printing Office. OCLC 220327009.
- Coates, John (1999). Bravery Above Blunder: The 9th Australian Division at Finschhafen, Sattelberg, and Sio. South Melbourne, Victoria: Oxford University Press. ISBN 0-19-550837-8.
- Coulthard-Clark, Chris (1998). Where Australians Fought: The Encyclopaedia of Australia's Battles (1st ed.). St Leonards, New South Wales: Allen & Unwin. ISBN 1-86448-611-2.
- Dexter, David (1961). The New Guinea Offensives. Australia in the War of 1939–1945, Series 1—Army. Vol. VII (1st ed.). Canberra, Australian Capital Territory: Australian War Memorial. OCLC 2028994.
- Grant, Ian (1992). A Dictionary of Australian Military History. Milsons Point, New South Wales: Random House Australia. ISBN 0-091825-92-X.
- Johnston, Mark (2005). The Huon Peninsula 1943–1944. Australians in the Pacific War. Canberra, Australian Capital Territory: Department of Veterans' Affairs. ISBN 1-920720-55-3.
- Keogh, Eustace (1965). South West Pacific 1941–45. Melbourne, Victoria: Grayflower Publications. OCLC 7185705.
- Maitland, Gordon (1999). The Second World War and its Australian Army Battle Honours. East Roseville, New South Wales: Kangaroo Press. ISBN 0-86417-975-8.
- Miller, John (1959). Cartwheel: The Reduction of Rabaul. United States Army in World War II: The War in the Pacific. Washington, D.C.: Office of the Chief of Military History, Department of the Army. OCLC 1355535.
- Morison, Samuel Eliot (1950). Breaking the Bismarcks Barrier. History of United States Naval Operations in World War II. Boston: Little Brown and Company. ISBN 0-7858-1307-1. OCLC 10310299.
- Pratten, Garth (2014). "Applying the Principles of War: Securing the Huon Peninsula". In Dean, Peter (ed.). Australia 1943: The Liberation of New Guinea. Port Melbourne, Victoria: Cambridge University Press. pp. 255–284. ISBN 978-1-107-03799-1.
- Rodger, Alexander (2003). Battle Honours of the British Empire and Commonwealth Land Forces 1662–1991. Marlborough, United Kingdom: The Crowood Press. ISBN 1-861266-37-5.
- Tanaka, Kengoro (1980). Operations of the Imperial Japanese Armed Forces in the Papua New Guinea Theater During World War II. Tokyo, Japan: Japan Papua New Guinea Goodwill Society. OCLC 9206229.
