= Eizō =

- Gender: Male

Origin
- Origin: Japanese
- Meaning: Different meanings depending on the kanji used

Eizō, Eizo or Eizou (written: 栄三, 栄蔵, 英三, 英蔵 or 永三) is a masculine Japanese given name. Notable people with the name include:

- Ishizuka Eizō (石塚 英蔵; 1866–1942), Japanese politician
- Eizō Katō (加藤 栄三; 1906–1972), Japanese painter
- Eizo Kenmotsu (監物 永三; born 1948), Japanese gymnast
- Eizo Sakamoto (坂本 英三; born 1964), Japanese musician
- Eizō Sugawa (須川 栄三; 1930–1998), Japanese film director
- Eizō Tanaka (田中 栄三; 1886–1968), Japanese film director, screenwriter, and actor
- Eizo Yamada (山田 栄三; 1889–1950), Japanese general
- Eizo Yuguchi (湯口 栄蔵; 1945–2003), Japanese footballer and manager

== See also ==
- Eizo, a Japanese electronics company
