= 2/15th Battalion (Australia) =

Former infantry battalion of the Australian Army

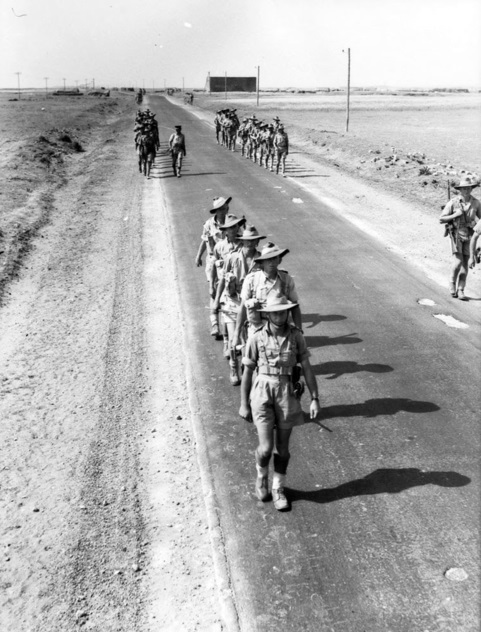
- Troops from the 2/15th Battalion at Tripoli, Syria, April 1942
- Active: 1940–1946
- Country: Australia
- Branch: Australian Army
- Type: Infantry
- Size: ~800–900 personnel (Note: By the start of World War II, the authorised strength of an Australian infantry battalion was 910 men all ranks; later in the war it fell to 803.)
- Part of: 20th Brigade, 7th Division; 20th Brigade, 9th Division
- Motto(s): Caveant Hostes (Let Enemies Beware)
- Engagements: World War II: Siege of Tobruk; First Battle of El Alamein; Second Battle of El Alamein; Huon Peninsula campaign; Borneo Campaign

Insignia
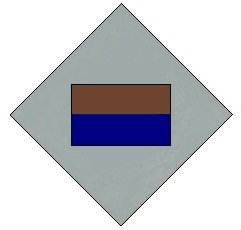
- Unit colour patch (1940–1942)

- (1942–1946)

The 2/15th Battalion was an infantry battalion of the Australian Army that served during World War II. Formed in May 1940 primarily from Queensland volunteers, the battalion saw action in North Africa in 1941–1942 as part of the 20th Brigade, which was part of the 7th Division before being reassigned to the 9th Division.

After completing training in Palestine, in early 1941, the 2/15th took up positions along the front line in the Western Desert, before being pushed back to Tobruk. Between April and October 1941, along with a garrison of British and other Australian personnel, the battalion helped to hold the strategically important port, which had been surrounded following the landing of German troops at Tripoli. It was withdrawn by sea in late October 1941 as the 9th Division was relieved by the British 70th Division. Following its withdrawal from Tobruk, the battalion re-formed at Gaza before undertaking garrison duties in Syria. In mid-1942, the 2/15th returned to North Africa to fight in the First and Second Battles of El Alamein.

In early 1943, the 2/15th returned to Australia and was re-organised and re-trained for jungle warfare. It took part in campaigns against the Japanese in New Guinea in 1943–1944 and Borneo in 1945, before being disbanded in 1946.

== History ==
=== Formation ===
The 2/15th Battalion (Note: The numerical designation of 2nd AIF units was prefixed by "2/", which was used to set them apart from Militia units with corresponding numerical designations that had no prefix.) was raised at Victoria Barracks in Brisbane on 26 April 1940 from Second Australian Imperial Force (2nd AIF) volunteers. It was one of three infantry battalions assigned to the 20th Brigade that were initially part of the 7th Division, the other two being the 2/13th and 2/17th Battalions. The battalion had an authorised strength of around 900 personnel like other Australian infantry battalions of the time, and was organised into four rifle companies – designated 'A' through to 'D' – each consisting of three platoons; these were supported by a battalion headquarters and a headquarters company with six specialist platoons: signals, pioneer, anti-aircraft, transport, administrative and mortars.

Upon formation, the 2/15th was placed under the command of Lieutenant Colonel Robert Marlan, an Australian Staff Corps officer of the Permanent Military Forces who arrived on promotion from major, having previously served in World War I with the 20th Battalion. The colours initially chosen for the battalion's unit colour patch (UCP) were the same as those of the 15th Battalion, a unit that had served during World War I before being raised as a Militia formation in 1921. These colours were initially purple and red in a diamond shape, but after representations from World War I veterans the colour patch was changed to brown over dark blue, in a rectangle shape. The patch was placed inside a grey diamond border added to distinguish the battalion from its Militia counterpart; this would change following the unit's involvement in the fighting at Tobruk, when it adopted a T-shaped UCP consisting of blue and green.

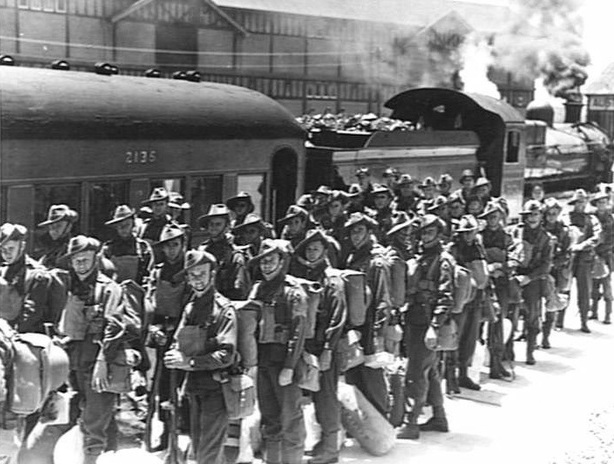
Signallers from the 2/15th Battalion prior to embarkation on the Queen Mary in Sydney, December 1940

Following the battalion's establishment, Marlan set about choosing a cadre of senior commissioned and non-commissioned personnel around which to build the battalion. These personnel included the battalion second-in-command, the quartermaster and adjutant, as well as senior enlisted soldiers to undertake administrative and instructional work. These were recruited from several of the existing Queensland-based Militia battalions including the 25th, 42nd and 47th Battalions. One member recruited at the time had served with the 15th Battalion that had been raised as part of the First Australian Imperial Force, during World War I.

After the first groups of personnel began arriving at Redbank, in south-east Queensland, in the middle of May, the battalion's headquarters moved to the camp and basic training commenced in June under instructors from the Australian Instructional Corps. In early July, the majority of the battalion was transported by train to Pinkenba, and from there to Darwin, in Australia's north, aboard the troopship Zealandia. Tasked with defending the port and its surrounds, the battalion was based around Vestey's meatworks near Mindil Beach, and in the months that followed was occupied with vital asset protection and area defence in between individual and collective training exercises. Personnel were joined by the majority of their vehicles, including 14 tracked Bren carriers in August, as well as a group of reinforcements. In October, elements of the battalion were used as stevedores during a wharf labourers' strike.

In the absence of the Darwin personnel, the battalion's rear details shifted from Redbank to Grovely where route marches were carried out in the Samford Valley. In late October, the rear details personnel returned to Redbank at the end of the month where more equipment was received. The main body of the battalion remained in Darwin, forming part of the town's defensive garrison. They were relieved by the 2/25th Battalion in late October 1940, and embarked again on the Zealandia. Sailing via Bowen where shore leave was granted, the 2/15th reached Hamilton, in Brisbane, in early November to marry up with the rear details at Redbank. Further training was undertaken at Redbank at this time before the whole battalion entrained for Brisbane on Christmas Day, embarking aboard the Queen Mary bound for Sydney. There, the ship joined up with a larger convoy that was bound for the Middle East theatre.

=== Middle East ===
Sailing via Colombo, the battalion disembarked in Bombay, transferring to the Rohna for the remainder of the journey. Transitting the Suez Canal, it disembarked at El Kantara, in Egypt, in February 1941. En route to the Middle East, the 20th Brigade was reassigned to the 9th Division, as part of a reorganisation of the Australian divisions in the Middle East prior to I Corps' deployment to Greece. Upon arrival in Egypt, the battalion moved to a base in Gaza dubbed Kilo 89, where it concentrated with the 2/13th and 2/17th Battalions, which had arrived earlier in Palestine as the 9th Division attempted to make good its equipment and training deficiencies. The battalion's war equipment, including vehicles, arrived in mid-February and throughout the month the troops were introduced to the Bren light machine gun, firing it for the first time at the Jaffa Range and practicing constructing defensive systems in preparation for desert warfare. Individual training undertaken at this time was aimed at identifying those who would be unfit for the coming battle, and many were subsequently transferred to the divisional guard battalion.

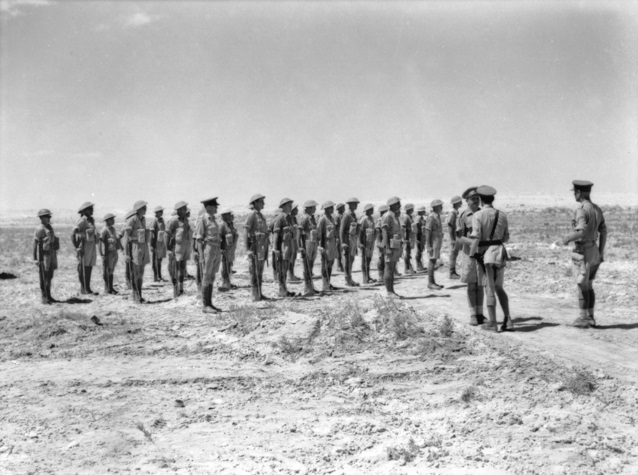
Troops from the 2/13th and 2/15th Battalions on parade, August 1942

In early March 1941, the 2/15th entrained at Gaza and moved to Mersa Matruh, as the 9th Division began to relieve the 6th Division along the front line in the Western Desert so that the latter could be transferred to Greece, where a German invasion was expected. A few days later the battalion was moved to Tobruk. From there it moved by road in captured Italian vehicles to Derna and on to Tochra, then Benghazi, and eventually Barce. Throughout early April, the 2/15th became involved in the large-scale withdrawal that followed the landing of German forces around Tripoli as part of Axis efforts to reinforce the Italians in North Africa following British gains in western Egypt and Cyrenaica during Operation Compass in 1940–41. The battalion subsequently fell back east along the coast towards Tobruk. During the retreat about 180 men, including the battalion's commanding officer, Marlan, were taken prisoner when their headquarters was surrounded by a force of 18 tanks and unsuccessfully attempted to fight their way out. These men spent several years in captivity, being held initially in camps in North Africa before moving to Italy and later Germany; some managed to escape either in North Africa, or from Italy; several eventually rejoined the battalion, while others linked up with Italian or Yugoslavian partisans with whom they fought against German forces later in the war.

Lieutenant Colonel Robert Ogle took over command of the battalion following Marlan's capture. It subsequently joined the defence of Tobruk, as part of the defensive garrison that held the strategically important port after it was placed under siege by the advancing German and Italian forces. The battalion remained there for over six months conducting patrols and raids, and holding positions around the perimeter until late October 1941, when the bulk of the 9th Division, less the 2/13th Battalion and two companies from the 2/15th, were withdrawn by sea and replaced by British troops from the 70th Division. The 2/15th's casualties during the withdrawal from Benghazi and the siege of Torbuk amounted to 45 killed in action or died of wounds, one accidentally killed, 103 wounded in action and 205 captured.

The 2/15th was subsequently withdrawn to Gaza, where it stayed into the new year, before moving to Syria, where it formed part of the Allied occupation force established there at the end of the Syria–Lebanon campaign. In July 1942, in the face of a heavy German onslaught that threatened to break through to Suez, the 9th Division was hurriedly moved back to North Africa. The 2/15th subsequently took part in the First and Second Battles of El Alamein during the remainder of the year. Throughout August, the 2/15th subsequently held a position in the north-east sector of the line from Hill 33 to the coast. On 1 September, the 2/15th participated in the 9th Division's diversionary attack south of Tel-el-Eisa, codenamed Operation Bulimba, which was planned as a response to German offensive actions further south during the lead-up to the final assault in late October and early November 1942. In heavy fighting near Point 23, a low rocky outcrop, the battalion lost about half of its fighting strength, sustaining 183 casualties, amidst heavy hand-to-hand fighting as the battalion came up against heavy resistance after penetrating a German minefield. Ogle's carrier struck a mine during the operation, and he was seriously wounded. The battalion's role in the September attack, including the efforts of Corporal Horton McLachlan, who received the Distinguished Conduct Medal, was later depicted in a painting by Ivor Hele. Among the casualties at El Alamein was the 2/15th's recently appointed replacement commanding officer, Lieutenant Colonel Keith Magno, who was mortally wounded by artillery fire after the battalion was heavily shelled while forming up during an attack around Trig 29 – a valuable piece of high ground south-west of Tel-el-Eisa – on 28 October. Casualties over both periods the battalion fought around Alamein totaled 81 killed, 23 died of wounds, 276 wounded and seven captured.

=== New Guinea and Borneo ===
By early 1943 the Australian Army's focus had shifted to operations in the Pacific theatre against the Japanese, and the 9th Division received orders to return to Australia to join the other two 2nd AIF divisions, the 6th and 7th, which had departed earlier in 1942. A divisional parade was held in Gaza, after which the 2/15th embarked upon the transport Acquitania and sailed with a large convoy established under Operation Pamphlet as part of the final stage in the withdrawal of the 2nd AIF divisions from the Middle East. After a journey of just over a month, the Acquitania berthed at Sydney in late February 1943. During this time the battalion was under the command of Lieutenant Colonel Raymond Barham.

After disembarking in Sydney, the troops received three weeks of leave during which time they were allowed to return to their homes. The 9th Division then carried out welcome home marches across Australia, with the 2/15th taking part in the march through Brisbane. After this, the division was transported to Kairi on the Atherton Tableland in north Queensland where it was converted to the jungle establishment and began training for operations against the Japanese. The reorganisation saw the battalion establishment drop to around 800 men, and the loss of many vehicles and heavy equipment. Lieutenant Colonel Colin Henry Grace was appointed to command the battalion in May 1943 and would do so for the rest of the war. Amphibious training was carried out at Trinity Beach, near Cairns, with the US 532nd Engineer Boat and Shore Regiment in July 1943.

Following training, the battalion was deployed to New Guinea, arriving in Milne Bay in early August 1943. It saw action in the final stages of the Salamaua–Lae campaign in September 1943. The 2/15 took part in the landing at Lae, the first amphibious operation undertaken by Australian forces since the failed Gallipoli campaign in 1915. During the operation, the 2/15th was initially assigned the task of securing the beachhead following the 20th Brigade's landing. After being relieved it joined the advance west towards the town, slowed by heavy rains that turned the many creeks in the area into raging torrents, which were invariably covered by heavy Japanese fire from the opposite bank.

Later in September, after Lae had fallen to troops of the 7th Division advancing from Nadzab, the 20th Brigade undertook a follow-up operation further east, an opposed amphibious landing at Scarlet Beach, as part of Allied efforts to secure the Huon Peninsula. During the landing, the 2/15th formed the 20th Brigade's reserve force, coming ashore around Katika due to a navigational error; here it fought to dislodge strongly entrenched Japanese forces as the Australians established a beachhead. This was followed by the capture of Finschhafen, during which the 2/15th advanced alongside the 2/17th Battalion. The battalion's main effort was focused around securing a crossing over the Bumi River northwest of Finschhafen. After the town had been captured, it was tasked with expanding the Australian beachhead further west towards Kumawa as part of the drive on Sattelberg. For his actions during the battalion's attack around Kumawa on 13 October 1944, Corporal William Woods – who had destroyed two machine gun positions singlehandedly after most of his section had been wiped out – was recommended for the Victoria Cross, the only member of the battalion to be nominated for the award. It was subsequently downgraded to a Distinguished Conduct Medal.

After a short period of rest while Sattelberg was captured by the 26th Brigade, in late November the 2/15th joined the advance to Wareo, capturing Nongora village, crossing the Song River, and then undertaking patrols through the Christmas Hills until relieved by elements of the 4th Brigade, which pushed the Australian advance along the coast, forcing the Japanese north towards Sio as the Australians sought to secure the Huon Peninsula. In late December, the 20th Brigade rotated back into the lead, and the 2/15th took over from the 22nd Battalion around the Tunom River, where the battalion headquarters came under aerial attack. After a brief pause near the flood swollen Tunom, the advance continued throughout December and into January 1944 with minor skirmishes punctuating the battalion's advance. Finally, on 21 January, at the edge of the Sazomu River, the order arrived for the 2/15th to be withdrawn to Finschhafen for rest prior to repatriation to Australia. The fighting in New Guinea cost the battalion 30 killed in action, six dead from wounds, four dead from accidents and 119 wounded.

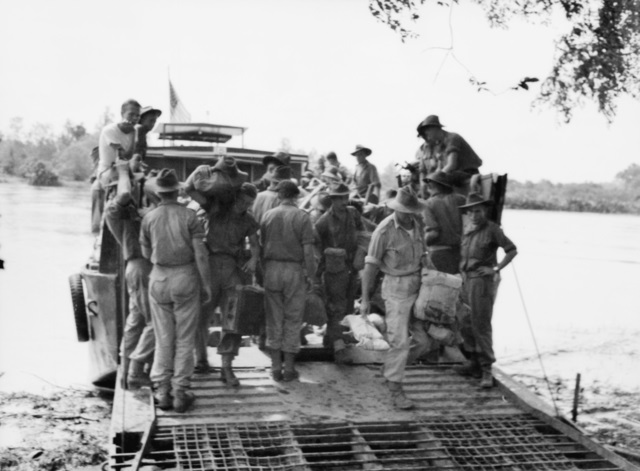
A platoon from the 2/15th lands at Limbang, Borneo, August 1945

The 2/15th Battalion returned to Australia in mid-March 1944 aboard the Klipfontein. After docking in Brisbane, a 42-day leave period followed before the battalion came together again at Ravenshoe to begin the process of rebuilding in preparation for the next phase of the war. Between June and August, training progressed from individual instruction up to brigade-level exercises as the unit was re-constituted for its next campaign. During training it experienced a high turnover of personnel and a large influx of reinforcements, including several officers, was received in the middle of 1944 from the disbanded 62nd Battalion, a Queensland-based Militia battalion that had previously been assigned to Merauke Force. A long period of training followed the battalion's return to Australia in early 1944, as there was a degree of uncertainty about the Australian Army's role in future operations in the Pacific after the US military assumed primary responsibility for combat operations in the theatre. Nevertheless, in the final months of the war the 2/15th took part in efforts to recapture North Borneo as part of Operation Oboe Six. After a battalion-level exercise in early 1945, the 2/15th sailed from Australia aboard the Charles Lummis in early May.

Staging out of Morotai Island, a detachment of the battalion landed on Muara Island on 10 June 1945, disembarking from US-operated LVTs and securing the island without opposition, while later, other elements from the 2/15th were put ashore on the peninsula around Brunei Town, as part of Allied operations to secure northern Borneo. While the main Australian force advanced towards Kuching and the oil fields around Seria, two companies of the 2/15th served as a "floating reserve" for the 2/13th Battalion's landing around Lutong, while the main body of the 2/15th subsequently moved inland towards Limbang, and began patrolling along the Limbang and Pandaruan Rivers that forked inland from the bay, using landing craft for mobility, and securing several small villages around the edge of the bay. Limbang was taken on 18 June, and two days later the two detached companies rejoined the battalion. Subsequently, several engagements were fought with the Japanese during patrols in June and July, but these were mainly small-scale; two members of the battalion were killed in an ambush around Brunei in late June, the heaviest fighting occurring in early July, when a patrol killed over 20 Japanese in a short but sharp encounter. By the end of July, a draft of 170 long-service personnel were released to return to Australia in early August, just as the war came to an end. Casualties for the 20th Brigade were light; the 2/15th suffered five battle casualties during its last campaign, two killed and three wounded.

=== Disbandment ===
After the war, the 2/15th remained on Brunei until November when it moved to Mempakul as personnel were returned to Australia in drafts based on priority of discharge. A small group of personnel volunteered at this time to undertake occupation duties in Japan and were subsequently transferred to the 66th or 67th Battalions. In early December, the battalion's vehicles were returned and after the appropriate clearances were received, the remaining cadre was transported to Labuan. From there, they sailed back to Australia aboard the Pachaug Victory, arriving at Brett's Wharf, in Brisbane on 19 December. The cadre moved into a camp at Chermside, where they completed unloading of stores and equipment before a short Christmas leave. Early in the new year, the final administrative tasks were completed and the last group of personnel were posted for demobilisation and discharge. Finally, the 2/15th was officially disbanded on 21 January 1946.

During its service a total of 2,758 men served with the 2/15th Battalion, of whom 191 were killed or died of wounds, another 25 died on active service, 501 were wounded, and 212 were captured. Members of the 2/15th received three Distinguished Service Orders, 10 Military Crosses, seven Distinguished Conduct Medals, 18 Military Medals, one British Empire Medal, 47 Mentions in Despatches and nine Commander-In-Chief Commendation Cards. In addition, four were appointed Members of the Order of the British Empire.

== Battle honours ==
The 2/15th Battalion received the following battle honours:

- North Africa 1941–43, El Adem Road, Alam el Halfa, West Point 23, Finschhafen, Scarlet Beach, Bumi River, Defence of Scarlet Beach, Nongora, Borneo, Brunei, Miri, Defence of Tobruk, The Salient 1941, El Alamein, South-West Pacific 1943–45, Lae–Nadzab, Liberation of Australian New Guinea and Sio.

These honours were subsequently entrusted in 1961 to the 15th Battalion, a Queensland-based part-time unit that was the successor to the unit of the same designation that had been raised during World War I.

== Commanding officers ==
The following officers served as commanding officer of the 2/15th:

- Lieutenant Colonel Robert Francis Marlan (1940–1941);
- Lieutenant Colonel Robert William George Ogle (1941–1942);
- Lieutenant Colonel Charles Keith Massy Magno (1942);
- Lieutenant Colonel Raymond James Barham (1942–1943);
- Lieutenant Colonel Colin Henry Grace (1943–1945).

== Notes ==
Footnotes

Citations
