= Pterostylis caulescens =

Scientific classification
- Kingdom: Plantae
- Clade: Tracheophytes
- Clade: Angiosperms
- Clade: Monocots
- Order: Asparagales
- Family: Orchidaceae
- Subfamily: Orchidoideae
- Tribe: Cranichideae
- Genus: Pterostylis
- Species: P. caulescens

Binomial name
- Pterostylis caulescens L.O.Williams

Species of orchid

Pterostylis caulescens is a plant in the orchid family Orchidaceae and is endemic to New Guinea. It was first formally described in 1946 by Louis Otho Williams from a specimen collected in the Rawlinson Range by Mary Strong Clemens. The description was published in the Harvard University Botanical Museum Leaflets. Williams noted that it was distinguished from other Pterostylis in New Guinea by its large stem leaves which are 55–75 mm (2–3 in) long and 14–18 mm (0.6–0.7 in) wide. He also noted that he was describing the plant from poor material but that the colour of the flower was "flesh pink". The specific epithet (caulescens) is derived from the Latin word caulis meaning "a stem", hence caulescent.
