= Junior Van Noy =

US Army soldier (1924–1943)

Junior N. Van Noy
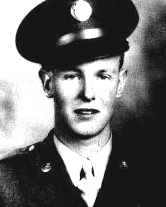
- Private Junior N. Van Noy
- Born: Nathan Kilby Van Noy Jr; August 9, 1924; Grace, Idaho, US
- Died: October 17, 1943 (aged 19) near Finschafen, New Guinea
- Burial place: Grace Cemetery Grace, Idaho
- Military career
- Allegiance: United States
- Branch: United States Army
- Service years: 1943
- Rank: Private
- Unit: 532nd Engineer Boat and Shore Regiment
- Conflicts: World War II: Huon Peninsula campaign †
- Awards: Medal of Honor

Junior N. Van Noy (9 August 1924 – 17 October 1943) was a United States Army soldier and a recipient of the United States military's highest decoration—the Medal of Honor—for his actions in the Battle of Finschhafen in World War II. His birthname was Nathan Kilby Van Noy Jr.

== Biography ==
Van Noy joined the Army from Preston, Idaho in February 1943, and by October 17, 1943, was serving as a private in the Headquarters Company of Shore Battalion, 532nd Engineer Boat and Shore Regiment. On that day, near Finschafen, New Guinea, he manned a machine gun during an enemy attack, refusing to withdraw even after being seriously wounded. He destroyed half of the small enemy force before being killed. For his actions during the battle, he was posthumously issued the Medal of Honor four months later, on February 26, 1944.

Van Noy, aged 19 at his death, was buried at Grace Cemetery in his birth city of Grace, Idaho. He was a member of the Church of Jesus Christ of Latter-day Saints.

== Medal of Honor citation ==
Private Van Noy's official Medal of Honor citation reads:

For conspicuous gallantry and intrepidity above and beyond the call of duty in action with the enemy near Finschafen, New Guinea, on October 17, 1943. When wounded late in September, Pvt. Van Noy declined evacuation and continued on duty. On October 17, 1943 he was gunner in charge of a machinegun post only 5 yards from the water's edge when the alarm was given that 3 enemy barges loaded with troops were approaching the beach in the early morning darkness. One landing barge was sunk by Allied fire, but the other 2 beached 10 yards from Pvt. Van Noy's emplacement. Despite his exposed position, he poured a withering hail of fire into the debarking enemy troops. His loader was wounded by a grenade and evacuated. Pvt. Van Noy, also grievously wounded, remained at his post, ignoring calls of nearby soldiers urging him to withdraw, and continued to fire with deadly accuracy. He expended every round and was found, covered with wounds dead beside his gun. In this action Pvt. Van Noy killed at least half of the 39 enemy taking part in the landing. His heroic tenacity at the price of his life not only saved the lives of many of his comrades, but enabled them to annihilate the attacking detachment.

The U.S. Army Engineer Port Repair ship Junior N. Van Noy was named for him in 1943 and was the first of the ships operating, reporting 10 August 1944 to assist in repairing the port of Cherbourg.

== See also ==
- List of Medal of Honor recipients
- List of Medal of Honor recipients for World War II
