= Cedric Edgar =

Australian Army officer

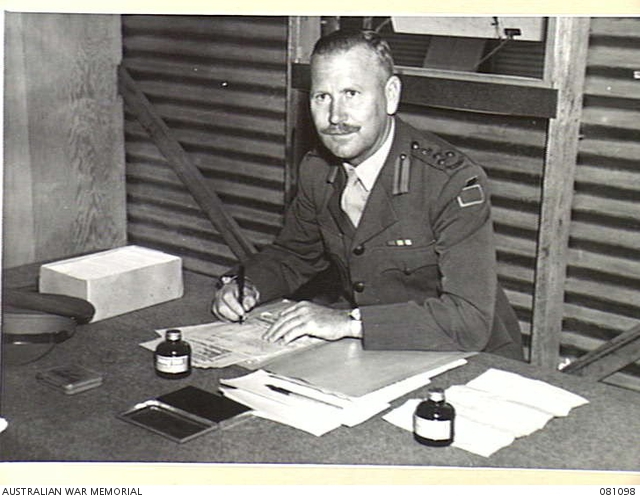
- Born: 9 July 1901; Wedderburn, Victoria
- Died: 2 September 1967 (aged 66); Concord Repatriation General Hospital, Sydney, New South Wales
- Relatives: Lieutenant General Hector Edgar (brother)
- Military career
- Allegiance: Australia
- Branch: Australian Army
- Service years: 1922–1946
- Rank: Brigadier
- Service number: NX140
- Commands: 13th Brigade (1945–46); 4th Brigade (1943–45); 2/2nd Battalion (1941–43)
- Conflicts: Second World War; North African Campaign; Battle of Bardia; Battle of Greece; New Guinea campaign; Kokoda Track campaign; Huon Peninsula campaign; New Britain campaign
- Awards: Commander of the Order of the British Empire; Distinguished Service Order; Efficiency Decoration; Mentioned in Despatches (2)

Brigadier Cedric Rupert Vaughan Edgar, CBE, DSO, ED (9 July 1901 – 2 September 1967) was an officer in the Australian Army during the Second World War.
