= Mape River =

River in Papua New Guinea

Coordinates: 6°34′S 147°43′E

Location
- Country: Papua New Guinea
- Region: Morobe Province

Physical characteristics
- Source
  - location: Papua New Guinea

The Mape River is a river located in the Morobe Province of Papua New Guinea.
