= 20th Brigade (Australia) =

Infantry brigade of the Australian Army during World War II

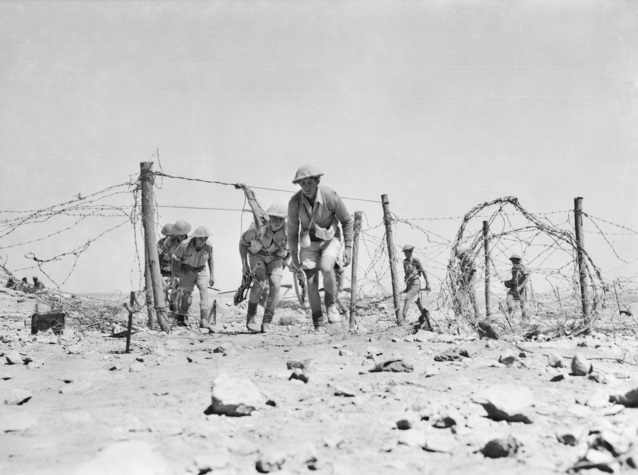
- A patrol from the 20th Brigade around Tobruk
- Active: 1912–1921; 1940–1946
- Country: Australia
- Branch: Australian Army
- Type: Infantry
- Size: ~2,500–3,500 personnel
- Part of: 9th Division
- Engagements: World War II: Siege of Tobruk; First Battle of El Alamein; Second Battle of El Alamein; Huon Peninsula campaign; Battle of North Borneo

Commanders
- Notable commanders: Victor Windeyer

Insignia
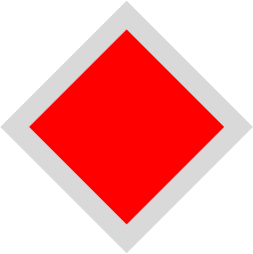
- Unit colour patch 1940–1942

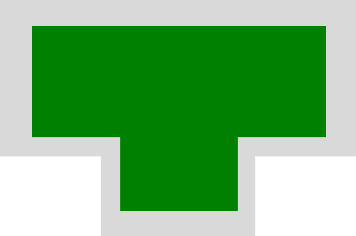
- 1942–1946

The 20th Brigade was a brigade-sized infantry unit of the Australian Army. First raised in 1912 as a Militia formation to provide training under the compulsory training scheme, the brigade was later re-raised on 7 May 1940 as part of the all volunteer Second Australian Imperial Force for service during the World War II. The brigade was initially assigned to the 7th Division, but was later transferred to the 9th Division in early 1941. They subsequently took part in the Siege of Tobruk that year, and then the First and Second Battles of El Alamein in 1942. In early 1943, the brigade was returned to Australia to join the fighting against the Japanese in the Pacific. In late 1943, the brigade took part in the capture of Lae and then the Huon Peninsula campaign. Withdrawn to Australia in early 1944, its final campaign came during the Battle of North Borneo in the final months of the war. It was disbanded in February 1946.

== History ==
=== Pre-war years ===
In 1912, when Australian introduced the compulsory training scheme, a total of 23 Militia brigades, mostly of four battalions, were planned for. These were assigned to six military districts around Australia. At this time, the 20th Brigade formed part of the 4th Military District. The brigade's constituent units had training depots in various locations around South Australia and western New South Wales, including Norwood, Magill, North Adelaide, Prospect, Gawler, Wallaroo, Kadina, Port Pirie, Petersburg and Broken Hill. The brigade's constituent battalions were sequentially numbered: 79th, 80th, 81st and 82nd. These units continued to exist on the Army's order of battle throughout the war years, within Australia, and separate from the deployed First Australian Imperial Force (AIF). In 1921, the AIF was formally disbanded and Australia's part time military force was reorganised. At this time, only 15 infantry brigades were formed, replicating the numerical designations of the formations of the AIF.

=== World War II ===
In May 1940, the 20th Brigade was re-raised as part of the all volunteer Second Australian Imperial Force (2nd AIF), opening its headquarters at Ingleburn, New South Wales on the 7th of the month. Consisting of three infantry battalions – the 2/13th and 2/17th from New South Wales, and the 2/15th from Queensland – the brigade was initially assigned to the 7th Division. The 2/15th moved to Darwin in July, to bolster the town's defences. Meanwhile, the remainder of the brigade concentrated around Bathurst in August, where training was undertaken. In October 1940, the 20th Brigade, less the 2/15th, deployed to the Middle East, where it moved into camp in Palestine. In February 1941, the brigade was transferred to the 9th Division as part of a reorganisation that moved the more combat ready brigades to the 7th Division. The 2/15th Battalion was reunited with the brigade around this time.

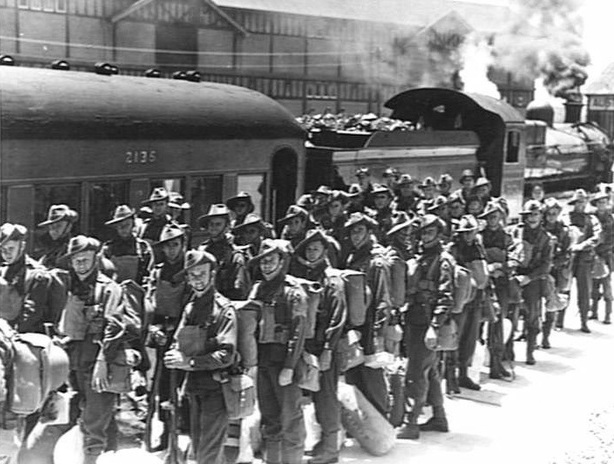
Signallers from the 2/15th Battalion prior to embarkation on the Queen Mary in Sydney, December 1940.

The following month, the 9th Division was sent forward into the Western Desert to relieve the 6th Division following their victories at Bardia and Tobruk. The 6th Division was to be sent to Greece where a German invasion was expected, and so the 20th Brigade and took over from the 17th around Marsa Brega in Cyrenaica. A further move was undertaken to Er Regima, where the brigade was tasked with holding approaches around the Benghazi Plain. After German forces landed around Tripoli to reinforce the Italians in North Africa, a large scale withdrawal began as the British and Australian forces were pushed back towards Tobruk, which was subsequently surrounded and placed under siege. During the withdrawal, the 2/15th Battalion's headquarters was surrounded and captured after attempting to fend off an attack by German tanks, while the 2/13th fought a more successful delaying action around Er Regina. Between April and October 1941, the 20th Brigade took part in the defence of the strategic port, helping to hold back the German thrust around the El Adem Road and then holding the line at various points around the perimeter. Finally, they were relieved by the British 14th Infantry Brigade and withdrawn by sea.

After its withdrawal from Tobruk, the 20th Brigade concentrated around Hill 69 in Palestine where it was rebuilt and carried out further training. In early 1942, the Australian government sought the return of the 6th and 7th Divisions to Australia to meet the threat posed by Japan's entry into the war. Subsequently, the 9th Division was deployed to Syria to carry out occupation duties, replacing the 7th Division. During this time, the 20th Brigade took over from the 18th, with forces spread out in the northern border region between Aleppo, Latakia, Idlib and Afrine, guarding against a potential German invasion through Turkey. After being relieved by the New Zealand 6th Infantry Brigade, the 20th Brigade was freed up for training around Latakia in March. After this, they rotated between Tripoli on the coast and the northern frontier. In June, the 17th Brigade arrived to relieve the 20th, and they began preparations to return to Egypt following a renewed Axis offensive. As the situation became critical for the Allies, the 9th Division was hurriedly deployed to El Alamein in July. They subsequently helped halt the Axis advance during the First Battle of El Alamein, and then occupied defensive positions for the next four months. In September, the 20th Brigade launched a diversionary attack, Operation Bulimba, supported by the 2/8th Field Regiment. This was a prelude to the main Allied offensive that began in October, launching the Second Battle of El Alamein. During the offensive, the 9th Division attacked southwest from the Tel-el-Eisa, with the 20th Brigade being assigned to the division's left. After achieving a break in over the course of several days, the Australians then held off a series of determined counterattacks. Once these had been repelled, the focus of the fighting shifted away from the Australians as British forces were able to launch a break out, which subsequently forced the Germans to withdraw.

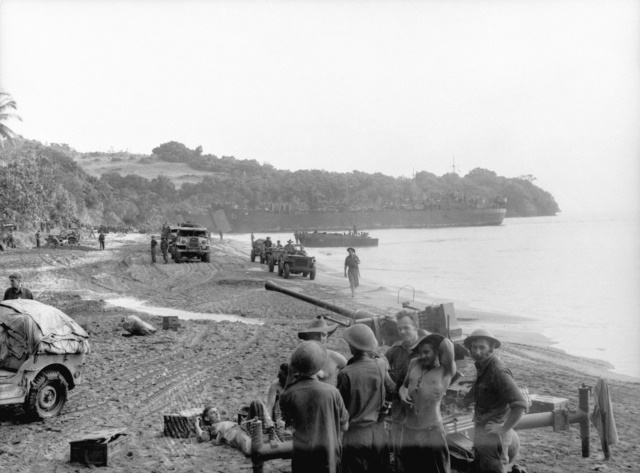
Australian soldiers and U.S. Army landing craft at Scarlet Beach on 22 September 1943.

The 9th Division was subsequently moved back to Palestine in November, occupying Julis camp as preparations were made for the division to return to Australia to join the fighting in the Pacific. This move began in January 1943. A period of leave followed, after which the 20th Brigade was reconstituted at Kairi, Queensland, where training was undertaken to prepare for deployment to New Guinea. Amphibious warfare training was undertaken during this time, as the division was assigned to an operation to capture Lae, which commenced in early September 1943. A preliminary move was made from Cairns to Milne Bay, after which the 20th Brigade landed on the coast 16 miles (26 km) east of Lae. Tasked with securing the beachhead and mounting patrols, the brigade played a limited role in the advance on the town, although the 2/17th Battalion was detached to the 26th Brigade during this stage of the operation. Just before the town was secured, the 4th Brigade arrived to relieve the 20th, which began moving east as the 9th Division's reserve element.

The capture of Lae was followed up quickly by another operation to secure Finschhafen. Landing at Scarlet Beach, 10 kilometres (6.2 mi) north of the objective, the 20th Brigade formed the division's lead assault element. After overcoming light opposition around the beachhead, the brigade began advancing on Finschhafen, leaving the 2/17th to secure the beachhead. Japanese opposition intensified as they approached the objective, and flanking units around Sattelberg threatened the brigade's rear, forcing Windeyer to deploy forces to guard his flanks and rear. By 2 October, the brigade had secured Finschhafen, having overcome strong resistance crossing the Bumi River, and around Kakakog. After this, reinforcements from the 9th Division arrived and the brigade's headquarters was moved to Heldsbach while elements were deployed at Simbang, Timoro, Kumawa and Jivevaneng. The Japanese launched a strong counterattack on Scarlet Beach in October, during which the 2/17th was isolated around Jivevaneng; the 2/13th was subsequently moved from Katika to fight their way through to the 2/17th, after which the brigade began pushing towards Sattelberg. In November, the 26th Brigade took over the advance, and the 20th went into reserve around Heldsbach, although the 2/15th was detached to the 24th Brigade to push the advance into the Christmas Hills. In December, the 20th Brigade resumed the advance from Masaweng River, moving along the coast as the Australians pushed towards Sio, which they reached in January 1944.

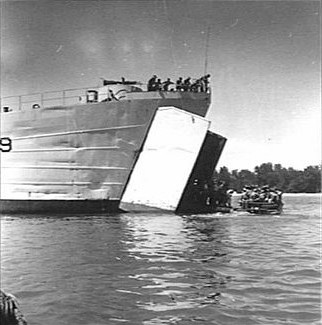
Troops from the 20th Brigade landing on Labuan in November 1945 after being withdrawn from Seria

Relieved by the 8th Brigade at Sio, the brigade was moved back to Finschhafen in February ahead of their withdrawal back to Australia for leave and reorganisation around Ravenshoe. The role of Australian troops in the Pacific had largely been taken over by US troops by this time, leaving the Australian troops with a limited combat role in the last years of the war in the Pacific. As a result, a long period of training followed while they waited for another assignment. This came in the final months of the war, when the 20th Brigade was assigned to the capture of North Borneo. Staging out of Morotai in April 1945, the brigade landed around Brunei Bay on 10 June. While the 24th Brigade landed on Labuan, the 2/17th and 2/15th Battalions from the 20th Brigade landed on the southern side of the bay, around Brooketon and Muara Island; the 2/13th was held back in reserve. There was only limited opposition to begin with and by 13 June Brunei had been captured by the 2/17th. The 2/13th was landed at this point at Lutong, and moved along the coast, pushing the advance towards Kuching. By late June, the brigade's headquarters had been established at Kula Belait, and the brigade had begun regular patrols as civil infrastructure was rebuilt. These continued until the end of the war when occupation duties saw the brigade oversee the surrender of the Japanese forces that remained in Brunei and Sarawak.

The brigade remained deployed in this area until late November 1945 when it began concentrating on Labuan. In early December, the first drafts of personnel returned to Australia for demobilisation, while personnel who were ineligible were posted to other units for further service. Throughout December, unit cadres were embarked, and by the end of the month only 11 personnel from the brigade's headquarters remained overseas. They subsequently embarked on the MV Reynella in early January 1946, arriving in Brisbane on 16 January. After moving to Chermside, the remaining personnel undertook administration duties to return stores and equipment and complete necessary documentation prior to disbandment. A final move to Ingleburn took place in early February and the brigade was finally disbanded there on 22 February 1946.

== Units ==
During World War II, the 20th Brigade consisted of the following units:

- 2/13th Battalion
- 2/15th Battalion
- 2/17th Battalion

== Commanders ==
The following officers commanded the 20th Brigade during World War II:

- Brigadier John Murray (April 1940 – December 1941)
- Brigadier Victor Windeyer (January – September 1942; October 1942 – January 1946)
- Brigadier Hugh Wrigley (September – October 1942)
