= 2/13th Battalion (Australia) =

Infantry battalion of the Australian Army during World War II

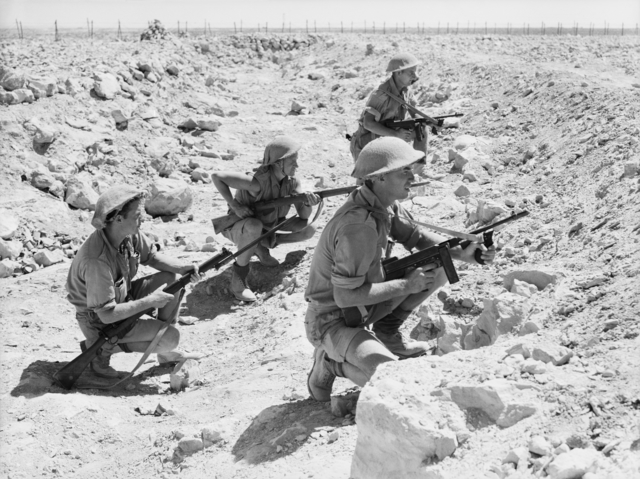
- A 2/13th patrol at Tobruk, September 1941
- Active: 1940–1946
- Country: Australia
- Branch: Australian Army
- Type: Infantry
- Size: ~800–900 personnel (Note: By the start of World War II, the authorised strength of an Australian infantry battalion was 910 men all ranks, however, later in the war it fell to 803 when the Australian Army converted to the jungle divisional establishment.)
- Part of: 20th Brigade, 7th Division; 20th Brigade, 9th Division
- Nickname(s): "Devil's Own"
- Engagements: World War II: Siege of Tobruk; First Battle of El Alamein; Second Battle of El Alamein; Huon Peninsula campaign; Borneo Campaign

Insignia
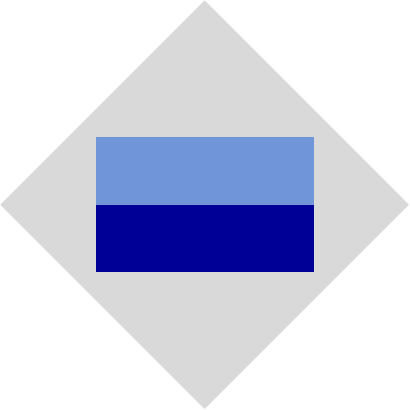
- Unit colour patch (1940–1942)

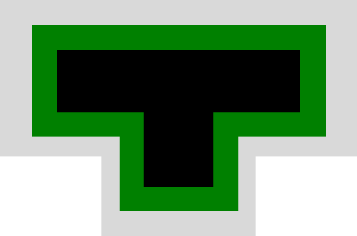
- (1942–1946)

The 2/13th Battalion was an infantry battalion of the Australian Army, which served during World War II. Formed in April 1940 from volunteers drawn primarily from New South Wales, as part of the 20th Brigade of the 7th Division, the battalion served in North Africa in 1941–1942, after being reassigned to the 9th Division. While most of the 9th Division was withdrawn from Tobruk, during October 1942, the battalion remained and fought alongside the new garrison built around the British 70th Division. Following the lifting of the siege, the battalion returned to Australia during 1943. It later took part in campaigns against the Japanese in New Guinea in 1943–1944 and Borneo in 1945, before being disbanded in 1946.

== History ==
=== Formation ===
The 2/13th Battalion (Note: The numerical designation of 2nd AIF units was prefixed by "2/", which was used to set them apart from Militia units with corresponding numerical designations.) was established in April 1940, from Second Australian Imperial Force (2nd AIF) volunteers drawn primarily from the state of New South Wales, the 2/13th Battalion. Along with the 2/15th and 2/17th Battalions, it formed part of the 20th Brigade, which was assigned on formation to the 7th Division. With an authorised strength of around 900 personnel, like other Australian infantry battalions of the time, the 2/13th was formed around a nucleus of four rifle companies, each consisting of three platoons.

Throughout the war, the 2/13th had six different unit colour patches (UCPs). The colours initially chosen for the battalion's UCP were the same as those of the 13th Battalion, a unit which had served during World War I before being raised as a Militia formation in 1921. These colours were light blue over dark blue, in a horizontal rectangle shape, with a border of gray in a diamond shape was later added to the UCP to distinguish the battalion from its Militia counterpart. Later, as the 7th Division was formed, it was decided that the division's colour patches would utilise a diamond shape to set them apart from the battalions of the 6th Division, so the battalion's colour patch was changed to a light blue over dark blue diamond. This was later changed to a black and red diamond inside a gray diamond border to conform with regulations that stipulated that the 20th Brigade's defining colour was to be red, although this did not last long, with the light blue over dark blue rectangle being restored shortly afterwards, being presented inside a gray diamond. A further change occurred when the battalion was transferred to the 9th Division, at which point it adopted a light blue over dark blue rectangle inside a gray circle. This remained the battalion's UCP until after the fighting at Tobruk, when it adopted a T-shaped UCP.

Individual training was undertaken at Ingleburn Army Camp, before the battalion marched in mid-August to Bathurst Army Camp where collective training was completed. By October the battalion was ready to deploy overseas and, under the command of Lieutenant Colonel Frederick Burrows, previously commanding officer of the 36th Battalion embarked along with the rest of the brigade from Sydney, bound for the Middle East on board the Queen Mary. While at sea, a reorganisation of the 7th and 9th Divisions resulted in several brigades being reallocated, and as a consequence the 2/13th, was reassigned to the 9th Division, along with the rest of the 20th Brigade.

=== Middle East ===
Sailing via Bombay, in India, where the battalion briefly camped at Deolali before transferring to the transport Christiaan Huygens on 12 November 1940. The battalion arrived in Egypt at the end of the month, disembarking at El Kantara on 26 November. After moving into camp at Kilo 89, on Gaza Ridge, they then spent several months completing further training in Palestine before the partially trained 9th Division was deployed to Cyrenaica in March 1941 following the departure of the 6th Division to Greece. Following the arrival of German forces in North Africa, the British were pushed onto the defensive and they were forced to withdraw from Benghazi to the strategic port of Tobruk, which subsequently fell under siege; the 2/13th formed part of the rearguard during the withdrawal during which it gained the distinction of being the first Australian Army unit to see action against the Germans, fighting a short, but sharp delaying action at Er Regima on 4 April 1941 against a force three times their size. At the time, the 2/13th had not yet completed its training, and was hastily equipped with captured Italian heavy weapons, mortars and signals equipment as it was put into the line on the rocky high ground around the Benina airfield. With one company guarding prisoners around Barce, the remainder of the 2/13th first went into action in the afternoon of 4 April 1941, as German infantry and tanks attacked their position over several hours. With support from a British artillery regiment, the 2/13th held their ground until late in the evening, until captured Italian vehicles were brought up to withdraw the battalion. The fighting cost the 2/13th Battalion 98 casualties.

Following this, the 2/13th joined the Tobruk garrison, as the port was surrounded. During the siege, the battalion occupied the perimeter and undertook defensive duties, remaining there for eight months, with the distinction of being the only Australian infantry battalion to see out the length of the siege, remaining alongside the new garrison built around the British 70th Division. The other Australian units were withdrawn earlier by sea and the intention had been to do the same for the 2/13th in October 1941, but the convoy scheduled to take the 2/13th out of Tobruk had been repelled by an Axis air attack and the British later asked for the battalion, less its advanced party which had already been evacuated, to remain for the subsequent break out attempt.

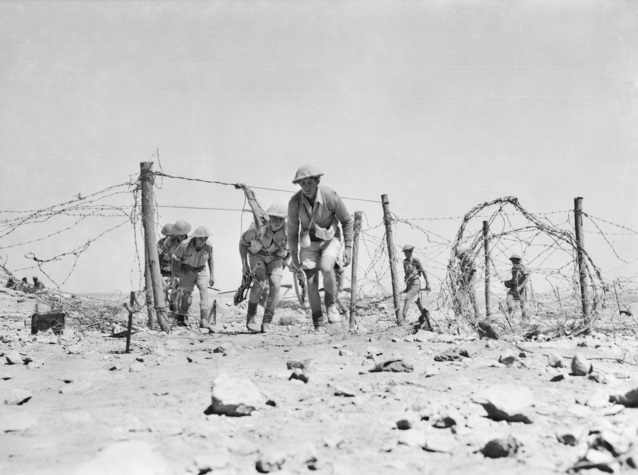
A patrol from the 2/13th around Tobruk

In November, the British launched Operation Crusader, to relieve the garrison at Tobruk. As part of this effort, the 2/13th Battalion was tasked with recapturing El Duda in late November after a battalion of the Essex Regiment was forced off the position. Supported by British armour and artillery, two companies totalling 160 men assaulted the position which was held by force of around 450 Germans. In the fighting that followed heavy casualties were inflicted on the defenders who were forced from the position, leaving 167 men who were taken prisoner. Following the capture of El Duda, the 2/13th undertook patrol actions in their sector, and endured a heavy bombardment, which resulted in further casualties, including the commanding officer, Burrows, after which Major George Colvin temporarily assumed command of the battalion in the field.

After the relief of Tobruk, in December 1941, the battalion moved to Palestine where it rejoined the rest of the 9th Division and subsequently undertook garrison duty in Syria, as part of the Allied occupation force that had been established there following the conclusion of the fighting against the Vichy French forces in the Syria–Lebanon campaign. During this period, Lieutenant Colonel Robert Turner took over command of the battalion. The 2/13th remained in Syria, based around Tripoli initially before moving to Aleppo, until July 1942 when the situation in North Africa became critical and the 9th Division was hurriedly moved west to El Alamein as the German Afrika Korps and Italian forces advanced towards Egypt. For the next four months, the battalion defended the northern sector of the Allied line, occupying Tel el Eisa in August, and then taking part in the Second Battle of El Alamein in October and November 1942. During the height of the battle, Turner was mortally wounded and command of the 2/13th fell to Colvin once again; he was subsequently confirmed in the position in later October 1942 and would command the 2/13th for the remainder of the war.

=== Pacific ===
The fighting around Tel el Eisa was the 2/13th's last involvement in the fighting in North Africa as the 9th Division was recalled to Australia in early 1943 to take part in the fighting against the Japanese in the Pacific, joining the other two 2nd AIF divisions – the 6th and 7th – which had been transported back the year before. Departing Egypt in January 1943 aboard the Acquitania, the 2/13th reached Sydney the following month. The battalion's personnel were given a long period of leave, before it was reconstituted on the Atherton Tablelands, in Queensland, where it was re-organised for jungle warfare and undertook amphibious training. Its next combat assignment came in early September 1943, when the 9th Division took part in a two-pronged assault on Lae, along with the 7th Division, with the 9th conducting an amphibious landing to the east of the town while the 7th advanced overland from Nadzab. After sailing from Cairns in late July, the battalion staged out of Milne Bay. During the landing, the 2/13th was tasked with coming ashore on "Yellow Beach", and then securing the beachhead for the follow on forces; it later sent out patrols to link up with the 2/15th Battalion and secure the right flank before the main advance west began.

Lae fell more quickly than the Allies expected and as a result a follow-up operation was mounted to secure the Huon Peninsula later in the month. Landing at Scarlet Beach in the first wave, two companies from the 2/13th secured the main beachhead while two others were also landed around Siki Cove on the first day of the operation. By October, the battalion occupied a position north of Langemak Bay which stretched in a dog-leg from Simbang north to Tirimoro. They were later involved in defending the beachhead against a Japanese counter-attack, and then the subsequent Australian advance inland as the Japanese withdrew towards Sio.

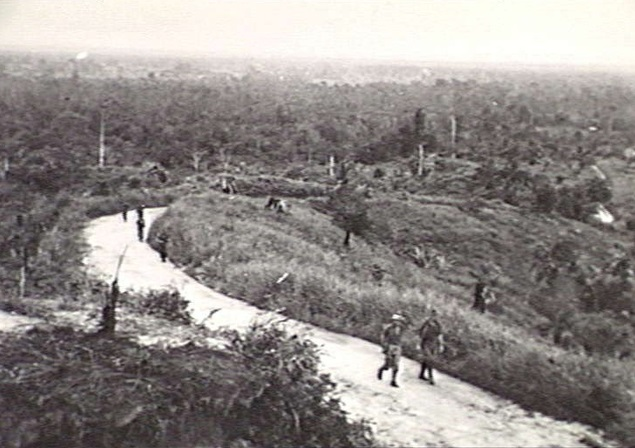
A patrol from the 2/13th returns to the battalion's positions around Miri, August 1945

They were withdrawn from the front in March 1944, for rest and re-organisation, subsequently returning to the Atherton Tablelands to concentrate near Ravenshoe where a long period of training followed. The battalion's final involvement in the war came when they were committed to Operation Oboe, the Allied operation to re-capture Borneo. Embarking upon the transport Frederick Lykes, the battalion concentrated on Morotai Island in April 1945, along with the rest of the 7th and 9th Divisions, the 2/13th Battalion was committed to the Battle of North Borneo on 20 June when it conducted an unopposed amphibious landing at Lutong on 20 June, before undertaking another landing and continuing their advance down the south-western coast, passing through Miri on 23 June, before continuing on to Seria on their way towards Kuching, securing several airfields and oilfields, and conducting patrols, as they went. The campaign ended with news of the Japanese surrender, following the atomic bombings of Hiroshima and Nagasaki, by which time the 2/13th had established itself around Lobang.

=== Disbandment ===
After the conclusion of hostilities, the 2/13th Battalion carried out various garrison duties such as guarding prisoners of war and maintaining internal security while the demobilisation process took place. Personnel were repatriated back to Australia or transferred to other units for further service; meanwhile, in November, the battalion was transferred to Luban, before finally being brought back to Australia in December 1945 for disbandment. During the course of the war, a total of 2,706 men served with the 2/13th Battalion of whom 245 were killed in action or died on active service, 87 were captured, and a further 630 wounded. Members of the battalion received the following decorations: three Distinguished Service Orders including one Bar, ten Military Crosses, one Member of the Order of the British Empire, six Distinguished Conduct Medals; 12 Military Medals including one Bar, one British Empire Medal, and 40 Mentions in Despatches. One former member of the battalion, Lieutenant Albert Chowne, who served with the 2/13th before being commissioned in 1944, was posthumously awarded the Victoria Cross for his actions while serving with the 2/2nd Battalion during the Aitape–Wewak campaign in 1945.

== Battle honours ==
The 2/13th Battalion received the following battle honours:

- Defence of Tobruk, El Alamein, South-West Pacific 1943–45, Lae–Nadzab, Liberation of Australian New Guinea, Sio, Er Regima, El Adem Road, Tobruk 1941, Belhamed, Defence of Alamein Line, Finschhafen, Bumi River, Scarlet Beach, Defence of Scarlet Beach, Jivenaneng–Kumawa, Borneo, Brunei and Miri.

== Commanding officers ==
The following officers served as commanding officer of the 2/13th:

- Lieutenant Colonel Frederick Alexander Burrows (1940–1941);
- Lieutenant Colonel Robert William Newton Turner (1941–1942);
- Lieutenant Colonel George Edward Colvin (1942–1945).

== Notes ==
Footnotes

Citations
