= Eizo Yamada =

Eizō Yamada
- 山田 栄三
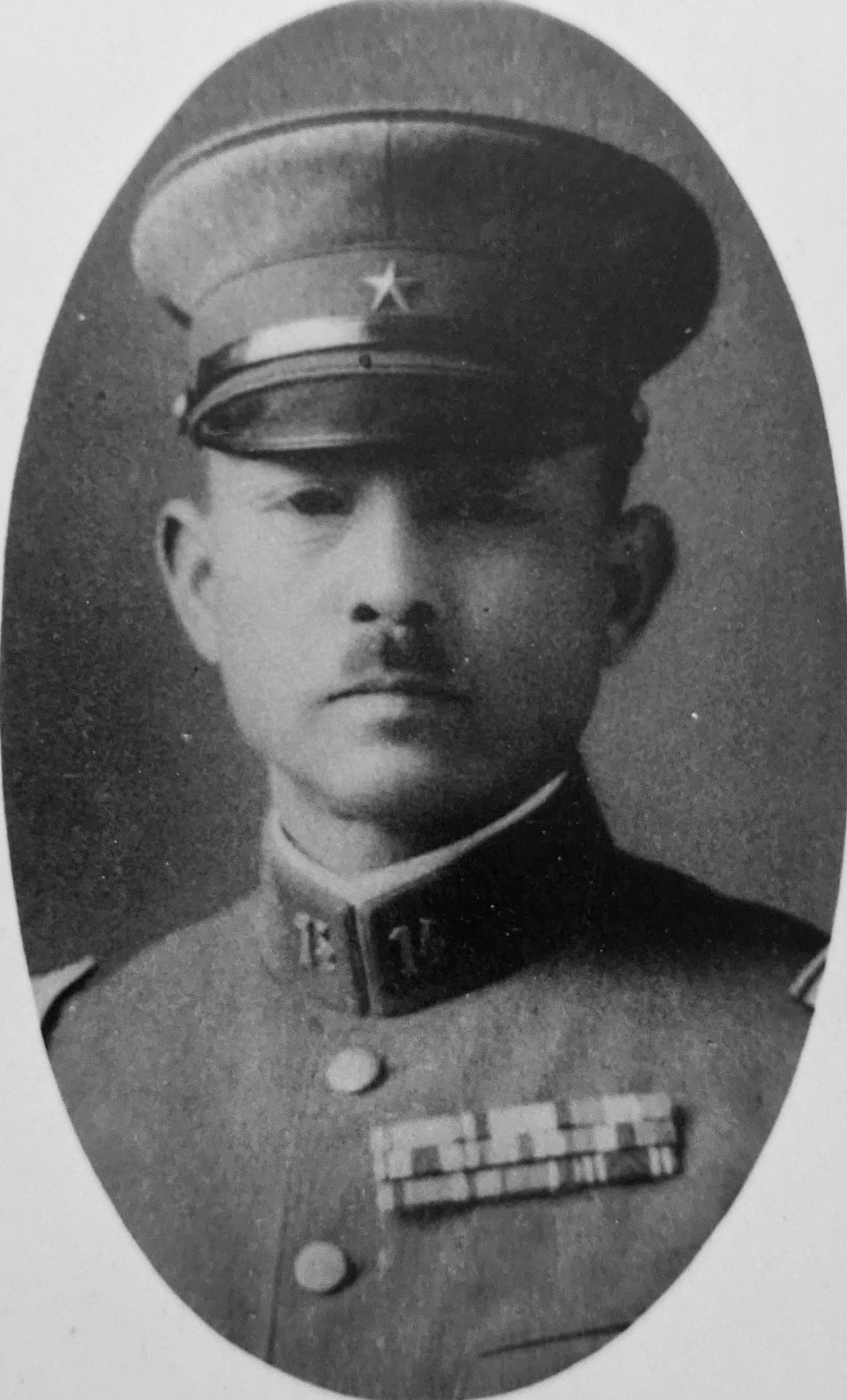
- Born: September 9, 1889; Tokyo, Japan
- Died: May 7, 1950 (aged 60)
- Military career
- Allegiance: Empire of Japan
- Branch: Imperial Japanese Army
- Service years: 1911–1945
- Rank: Major General
- Commands: 1st Naval Transport Command
- Conflicts: World War II

Eizō Yamada (山田 栄三, Yamada Eizō; September 9, 1889 - May 7, 1950) was a major general in the Imperial Japanese Army during World War II.

== Biography ==
Yamada was born in Tokyo. He graduated from the Imperial Japanese Army Academy in 1911, and served as a lieutenant in the IJA 15th Engineering Battalion. He became an instructor at the Army Institute of Technology in 1925 and was promoted to major in 1928 and lieutenant colonel in 1933, and colonel in 1938. In 1939, he became commander of the Imperial Guards Engineering Battalion. Yamada was promoted to major general in October 1941 and assigned as Chief of the Ordnance Section, Eastern Army.

On February 23, 1943, Yamada became the commanding officer of the 1st Naval Transport Command. He played a major role in the Battle of Finschhafen in New Guinea between September 22 and October 24, 1943. Yamada was assigned to defend Finschhafen with 1200 mostly non-combatant troops (barge operators and mechanics). Realizing that he would not be able to hold against the Allied attack, IJA 18th Army commander, Lieutenant General Hatazo Adachi, managed to send 4000 reinforcements from the IJA 20th Division before the battle. Nevertheless, Yamada was driven from Finschhafen and was unable to recover it in his counterattack. Yamada was evacuated after the battle and from June 1945 was reassigned to the staff of the IJA 18th Army.
