= 102nd Infantry Regiment (Imperial Japanese Army) =

- Active: World War II
- Country: Japan
- Branch: Infantry
- Part of: Eighteenth Army
- Engagements: Second Sino-Japanese War; New Guinea campaign

The 102nd Infantry Regiment was an infantry regiment in the Imperial Japanese Army. The regiment was at one stage attached to the 128th Infantry Brigade, of the 114th Division, in the Tenth Army during the Second Sino-Japanese War. The regiment was later attached to the Eastern District Army on 7 September 1940, then the Kwantung Army on 1 August 1941, then assigned to the Twenty-Third Army on 19 September 1941 and the Eighteenth Army in November 1942. The regiment participated during the Second Sino-Japanese War and during the later stages of World War II, the regiment was in New Guinea, taking part in the New Guinea campaign.

== Organization ==
- 1st Battalion
- 2nd Battalion
- 3rd Battalion

== Commanders ==
- Colonel Yasuhei Maruoka - Jan 1943
- Colonel Keijiro Hori - Jun 1943
