= Rawlinson Range =

Mountain range in Papua New Guinea

- Location within Papua New Guinea

Highest point
- Coordinates: 6°32′S 147°20′E

Geography
- Location: Papua New Guinea

Rawlinson Range is a mountain range on the Huon Peninsula in north-eastern Papua New Guinea.

The range was named after Sir Henry Rawlinson president of the Royal Geographical Society from 1874 to 1875.
