= 532nd Engineer Boat and Shore Regiment =

United States Army engineer unit in World War II

The 532nd Engineer Boat and Shore Regiment was a United States Army engineer unit that served in World War II and the Korean War. It was designated the 532nd Engineer Amphibian Regiment in July 1943 and was assigned to the 2nd Engineer Special Brigade.

One member, Junior Van Noy, was posthumously awarded the Medal of Honor for actions during the Huon Peninsula campaign.
