= 238th Infantry Regiment =

The 238th Infantry Regiment was an infantry regiment in the Imperial Japanese Army. The regiment was attached to the 41st Division. The regiment participated during the Second Sino-Japanese War and during the later stages of World War II, the regiment was in New Guinea, as part of the Japanese Eighteenth Army taking part in the New Guinea campaign.

== Organization ==
- 1st Battalion
- 2nd Battalion
- 3rd Battalion
