= Landing at Scarlet Beach =

1943 landing in New Guinea

- Part of the Pacific theatre of the Second World War
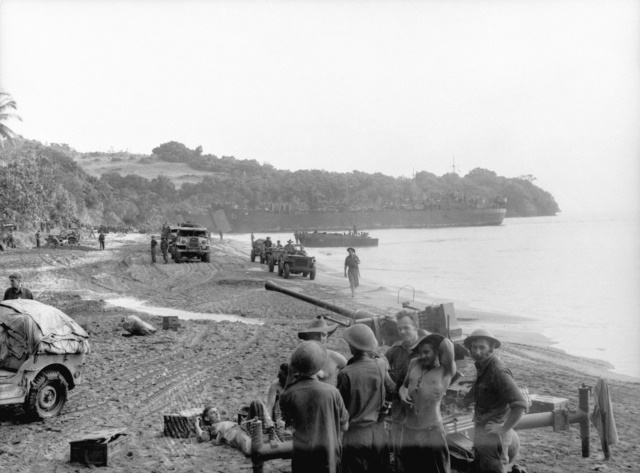
- Australian soldiers and U.S. Army landing craft at Scarlet Beach on 22 September 1943. A Landing Ship Tank of the VII Amphibious Force unloads in the background.
Date	22 September – 2 October 1943
Location	Huon Peninsula, New Guinea 6°29′S 147°51′E
Result	Allied victory

Belligerents
Australia; United States	Japan

Commanders and leaders
(Australia) Edmund Herring (Australia) Victor Windeyer (United States) Daniel E. Barbey	(Empire of Japan) Hatazō Adachi (Empire of Japan) Eizo Yamada

Units involved
(Australia) 9th Division: 20th Brigade	(Empire of Japan) 20th Division: 80th Infantry Regiment; 1st Shipping Group

Strength
5,300	5,000

The Landing at Scarlet Beach (Operation Diminish) took place in New Guinea in September 1943, during the Huon Peninsula campaign of the Second World War. Allied forces landed at Scarlet Beach, north of Siki Cove and south of the Song River, to the east of Katika and about 10 kilometres (6.2 mi) north of Finschhafen. The capture of Finschhafen allowed the construction of air bases and naval facilities to assist Allied forces to conduct operations against Japanese bases in New Guinea and New Britain.

After Lae had fallen sooner than the Allies had anticipated, they exploited the advantage. As a result of faulty intelligence, which underestimated the size of the Japanese force in the area, the assault force chosen consisted of only Brigadier Victor Windeyer's 20th Infantry Brigade. The landing at Scarlet Beach that took place on 22 September 1943 was the first opposed amphibious landing that Australian forces had made since the Landing at Anzac Cove in the Gallipoli Campaign of 1915. Navigational errors resulted in the troops being landed on the wrong beach, with some of them coming ashore at Siki Cove and taking heavy fire from the strong Japanese defences in pillboxes. After re-organising, the Australians pushed inland. The Japanese put up stiff resistance on the high ground at Katika, but were forced back. By the end of the day, the Australians had secured their objectives. The Japanese launched a retaliatory air raid on the ships of the VII Amphibious Force, but US fighter aircraft defended the convoy and no ships were hit. Continued Japanese air attacks on the beachhead inflicted numerous casualties over the course of the battle.

The next day the Australians commenced their advance south towards the village of Finschhafen, about 9.0 kilometres (5.6 mi) south of the landing beach, with the 2/15th Infantry Battalion leading the way to the Bumi River. The Japanese had established strong defences along the river's southern bank, which the Australians attempted to outflank by sending a force to the west, climbing through steep terrain. Once they had located a suitable place to cross the river, they began wading across but were fired upon by a group of Japanese naval infantry who were positioned on a high feature overlooking the river. Despite taking casualties, the Australians were able to establish themselves south of the Bumi River and at that point the 2/13th Infantry Battalion began to advance on Finschhafen from the west. Meanwhile, the 2/15th attacked the left flank of the Japanese that had opposed their crossing. After advancing up the steep slope under fire, sometimes on their hands and knees, the 2/15th took the position at the point of the bayonet, killing 52 Japanese in close combat.

Australian fears of a Japanese counter-attack grew and they requested reinforcements from General Douglas MacArthur. This was denied as his intelligence staff believed there were only 350 Japanese in the vicinity; in fact, there were already 5,000. The Australians received some reinforcements in the shape of the 2/43rd Infantry Battalion. The arrival of this unit meant the entire 20th Infantry Brigade could concentrate on Finschhafen. The Japanese naval troops which were holding Finschhafen began to withdraw and Finschhafen fell to the Australians on 2 October. The 20th Infantry Brigade then linked up with the 22nd Infantry Battalion, a Militia infantry battalion that had cleared the coastal area in the south of the Huon Peninsula, advancing from Lae over the mountains. The Japanese withdrew into the mountains around Sattelberg.

== Strategy ==
=== Allied ===
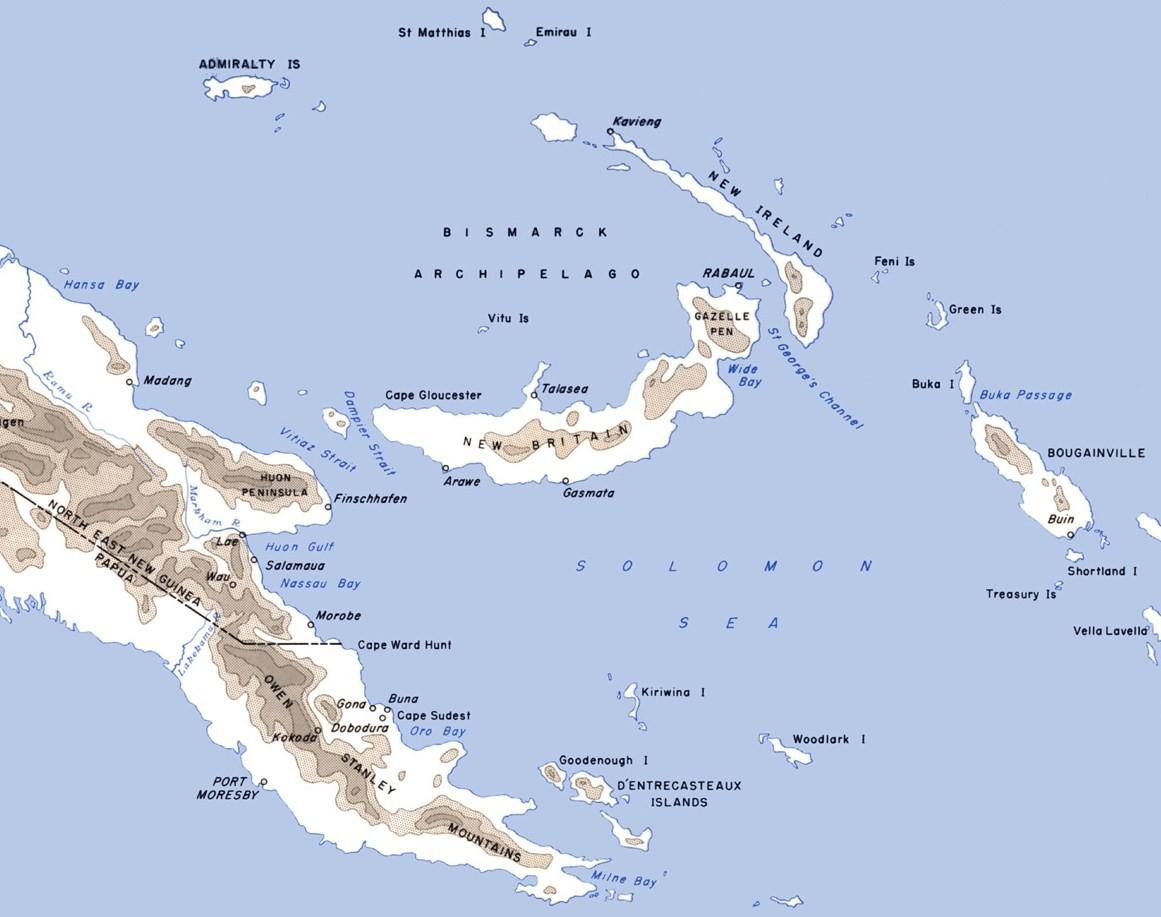
Papua and New Guinea

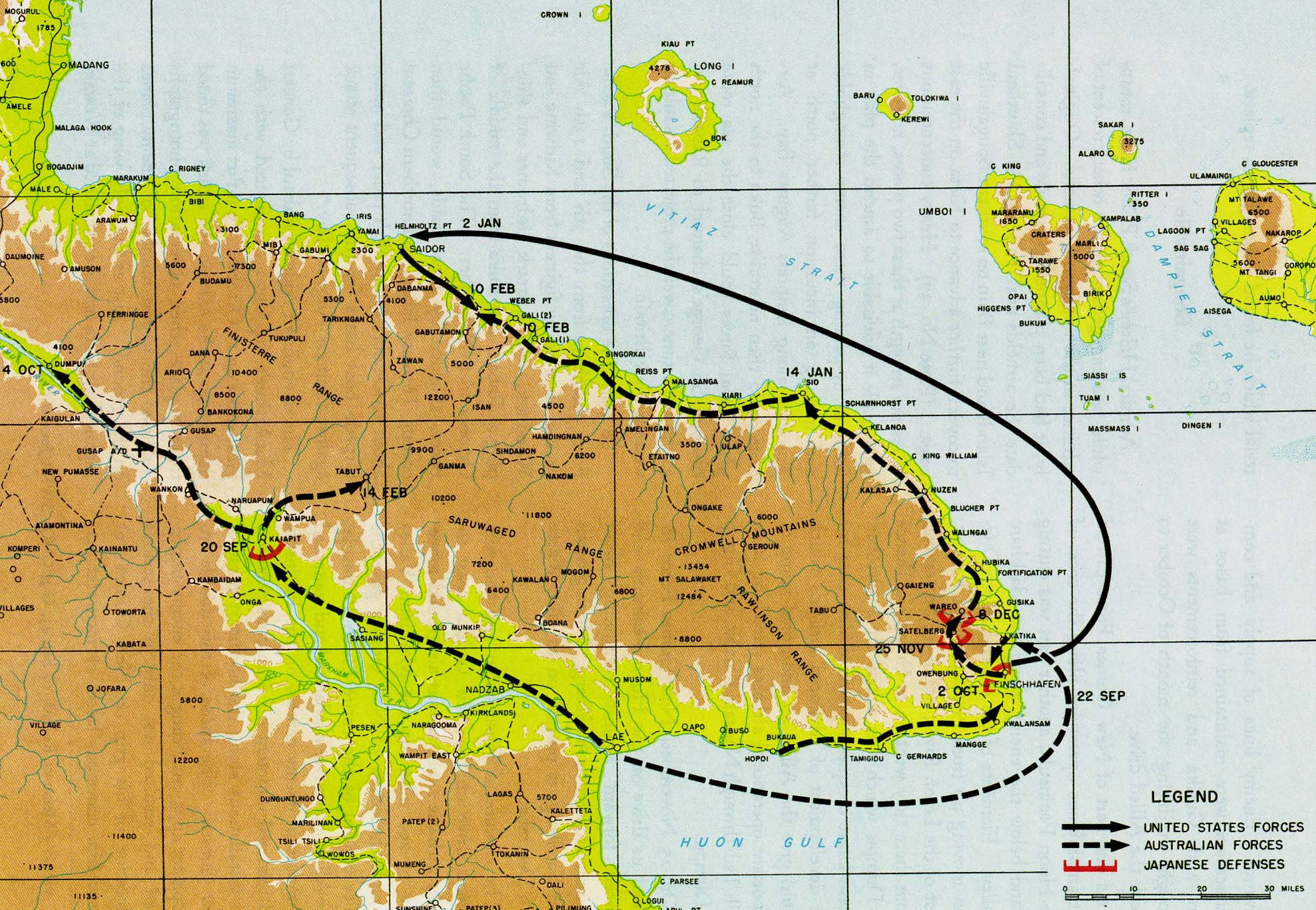
Huon Peninsula operations, 1943–44

At the Pacific Military Conference in Washington, D.C., in March 1943, the Joint Chiefs of Staff approved plans by General Douglas MacArthur, the Supreme Commander, South West Pacific Area (SWPA), for an advance on the Japanese base at Rabaul. On 13 June 1943, MacArthur's General Headquarters (GHQ) in Brisbane instructed General Sir Thomas Blamey's New Guinea Force to

...seize the Lae-Salamaua-Finschhafen-Markham River Valley area and establish major elements of the [Air Force] therein to provide from the Markham Valley area general and direct air support of subsequent operations in northern New Guinea and western New Britain, and to control Vitiaz Strait and protect the north-western flank of subsequent operations in western New Britain.

Following the successful seaborne landing at Lae and airborne landing at Nadzab, Salamaua, Lae, and the Markham River Valley were all in Allied hands by 16 September 1943. Blamey then turned his attention to his next objective: Finschhafen.

=== Japanese ===
The bombing of Wewak, in which 100 Japanese aircraft were lost in August 1943, caused Imperial General Headquarters (IGHQ) in Tokyo to reconsider whether Eastern New Guinea and the Solomon Islands could be held. Concluding that it could not, IGHQ authorised the commander of the Japanese Eighth Area Army to conduct a fighting withdrawal to a new defensive position in Western New Guinea, which it hoped would be ready in 1944.

Lieutenant General Hatazō Adachi, the commander of the Japanese XVIII Army in New Guinea, recognised the importance of the Finschhafen area, and had placed Major General Eizo Yamada, the commander of the 1st Shipping Group, in charge of defending it. To strengthen the defences there, Adachi ordered the 80th Infantry Regiment and a battalion of field artillery from the 20th Division at Madang to move to Finschhafen on 7 August 1943. The headquarters, artillery, and heavy weapons departed Bogadjim on 15 August and travelled by sea, but the remainder marched along the coast.

On 26 August, Adachi assigned the 2nd Battalion, 238th Infantry Regiment, part of the 41st Division, which was in the area en route to join the rest of the 238th Infantry Regiment at Salamaua, to remain in the Finschhafen area under Yamada's command. The landing at Lae on 4 September made an Australian advance on Finschhafen appear imminent, and Adachi ordered the rest of the 20th Division, less the Nakai detachment in the Markham Valley, to move to Finschhafen. The main body, under Lieutenant General Shigeru Katagiri, left Bogadjim bound for Finschhafen on 10 September, but was not expected to arrive before October. In the event of an Allied attack before he arrived, Yamada was to hold the high ground around Sattelberg and prepare for a counter-attack.

== Geography ==
The Huon Peninsula is situated along the north-east coast of Papua New Guinea, and stretches from Lae in the south on the Huon Gulf to Sio in the north along the Vitiaz Strait. Along the coast, between these two points, numerous rivers and streams cut the terrain. Of these, the most prominent are the Song, Bumi, and Mape Rivers. These waterways flow from the mountainous interior, which is formed through the conglomeration of the Rawlinson Range in the south with the Cromwell Mountains in the east. These meet in the centre of the peninsula to form the Saruwaged Range massif, which joins the Finisterre Range further west. Apart from a thin, flat coastal strip, at the time of the campaign, the area was thickly covered with dense jungle, through which very few tracks had been cut.

During planning, the Allies identified three areas as key and decisive terrain in the area: the beach north of Katika, which was later codenamed "Scarlet" by the Allies, the 960-metre-high (3,150 ft) peak called Sattelberg 8 kilometres (5 mi) to the south west, which dominated the area due to its height, and Finschhafen, possessing a small airfield and sitting on the coast in a bay which offered protected harbour facilities. Before the war, the town had a population of about 30 white and 60 indigenous people. There were good anchorages for vessels of up to 5,000 tons in Dreger Harbour, Langemak Bay, and Finsch Harbour. The flat coastal strip provided a number of potential airfield sites. German names abounded in the area because the Territory of New Guinea was a German colony from 1884 until it was occupied by Australia in 1914.

== Prelude ==
=== Intelligence ===
Allied estimates of the number of Japanese troops in the Finschhafen area varied. Brigadier General Charles A. Willoughby, the Assistant Chief of Staff (G-2), and therefore the head of the intelligence branch at MacArthur's GHQ, considered Finschhafen to be primarily a transhipment point, and the troops there to be mainly from line of communication units. The fall of Lae ended its utility, so he reduced his estimate of the number of Japanese troops in the area from 500 to 800 to just 350. Based on this appreciation, GHQ believed Finschhafen would be a "pushover".

There was reason to believe otherwise. A ten-man Allied Intelligence Bureau patrol that included three Australian officers, an American amphibian scout from the US Army's 532nd Engineer Boat and Shore Regiment, a signaller from Z Special Unit, and several Papua New Guinea soldiers, was landed during the night of 11/12 September in rubber boats launched from two PT boats. The scouts were unable to obtain the hydrographic information they sought due to Japanese patrols in the area. A number of machine-gun nests were identified during their reconnaissance of the enemy positions before they were extracted on 14 September.

As had happened during the Kokoda Track campaign and the Battle of Buna–Gona, estimates by Australian intelligence differed greatly from those at GHQ, as they used different methods. The intelligence staff at Blamey's Allied Land Forces Headquarters (LHQ), headed by Brigadier J. D. Rogers, had come up with a much higher figure of 3,000. I Corps produced an estimate of 1,800, which was passed on to the 9th Division along with GHQ's estimate, which it rejected. The Allies' best source of intelligence, Ultra, shone no light on the matter. Finschhafen was mentioned in only five decrypted messages in the previous three months, and most of these were in the insecure Japanese Water Transport Code. Only after the capture of Japanese codebooks in the Battle of Sio in January 1944 were the Allies able to systematically break into the Japanese Army codes. In fact, Japanese strength in the area on 22 September was about 5,000.

=== Planning ===
Two contingency plans were prepared by Lieutenant General Sir Edmund Herring's I Corps. One was a ship-to-shore operation by the 6th Division's 16th Infantry Brigade or the 7th Infantry Brigade, a Militia formation at Milne Bay; the other was for a shore-to-shore operation by a brigade of Major General George Wootten's 9th Division. The operation was codenamed "Diminish", which was actually that of Finschhafen itself. In the plan produced by I Corps on 24 August 1943, Herring selected beaches immediately south of the Song River for the landing. Indications were that it was suitable for landing craft. Most of the Japanese defenders and defences were believed to be facing south in anticipation of an Australian overland advance from Lae. It avoided having to cross the Mape River, which was believed to be a significant obstacle. The landing beach became known as Scarlet Beach from the post-landing red screens and lights used to guide landing craft. The left end of the beach was marked with a solid red panel mounted on tent poles, the right with one alternating red and white. At night, the left would have a red light, and the right one alternating red and white. This scheme was first used at Red Beach during the landing at Lae. To avoid confusion of having two Red Beaches, the landing beach was called Scarlet Beach instead.

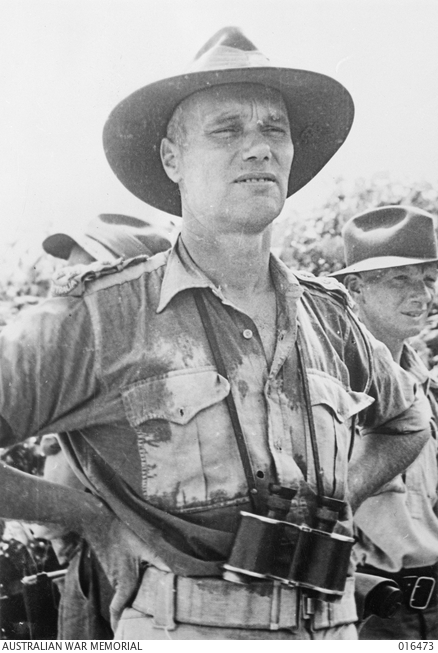
Brigadier Victor Windeyer won the Distinguished Service Order at the siege of Tobruk and again at the Second Battle of El Alamein

On 16 September, the day Lae fell, MacArthur ordered Finschhafen be captured as soon as possible. The following day he held a conference at Port Moresby. He and Blamey selected the second contingency, a landing by a brigade of the 9th Division. Brigadier Victor Windeyer's 20th Infantry Brigade was chosen as it was still relatively fresh, and had experience with amphibious operations from the landing at Lae. The 6th Division's movement to New Guinea was postponed. Rear Admiral Daniel E. Barbey, the commander of the VII Amphibious Force, had originally counted on four weeks break between the fall of Lae and the Finschhafen operation. On 9 September, he had told Herring it would require a minimum of ten days. Under pressure from MacArthur, Barbey cut that to three days. This was too soon for Herring to get the troops together, and 21 September was selected as the target date. Herring briefed Windeyer on the operation on 18 September. Windeyer felt the schedule was still too tight, and it was postponed one more day to 22 September.

As at Lae, the first wave, consisting of two companies each from the 2/13th and 2/17th Infantry Battalions, would land in plywood LCP(R)s launched by the four destroyer transports, the USS Brooks, Gilmer, Humphreys, and Sands. The remainder of the assault would land in six LSTs, 15 LCIs, and six LCTs of the VII Amphibious Force, and 10 LCMs and 15 LCVPs of the 532nd Engineer Boat and Shore Regiment. The total force would number about 5,300. The 9th Division would be limited to taking 15 days' supplies. One of the lessons of the Lae operation was the need for a naval beach party to take soundings, mark the beaches and channels, and handle communications between ship and shore. US Navy doctrine held that these should be composed of personnel drawn from the attack transports, but none were involved in the Lae or Finschhafen operations. For Finschhafen, an eight-man Royal Australian Navy (RAN) Beach Party was organised under Lieutenant Commander J. M. Band.

A set of oblique aerial photographs of Scarlet Beach were taken on 19 September by the USAAF's 8th Photo Reconnaissance Squadron, the only unit in SWPA with the equipment to take them, that showed a shallow sand bar along the southern half of the beach, rendering it unsuitable for landing craft. This left beaching space for only three LSTs. The landing plan was changed so only three of the six LSTs would beach with the initial assault, the other three returning to Buna, and arriving on the beach at 23:00 that night. Herring considered that spreading the LST arrivals might make unloading easier. Wootten noted that this would mean one battery of 25-pounders, one light antiaircraft battery, a quarter of the engineer stores, and the casualty clearing station would have to arrive with the second group. Soundings taken by the RAN Beach Party after the landing revealed the "sand bar" was actually a white shingle bottom, and no impediment to LST operations.

The main point of disagreement between Herring and Barbey concerned the timing of the landing. Barbey and the Commander of Allied Naval Forces, Vice Admiral Arthur S. Carpender, did not want a repeat of what happened at Lae, when two LCIs were lost and two LSTs were badly damaged. Although the USAAF and RAAF attacked Japanese air bases in New Britain, this did not stop nine Japanese bombers and 10 fighters from attacking Nadzab on 20 September. Moreover, some 23 Japanese warships were sighted in the harbour at Rabaul, and there were reports of Japanese submarines in the area. Accordingly, Barbey proposed landing at 02:00 under a quarter moon, which would allow his ships to unload and get away soon after dawn. Noting that it was the rainy season, and the sky would therefore likely be overcast, Herring doubted the VII Amphibious Force would be able to locate the beach, and pressed for a dawn landing at 05:15. In the end, a compromise was reached on 04:45. Samuel Eliot Morison, the US Naval historian, noted that: "The Australians proved to be right; 'Uncle Dan's' outfit was not prepared for a neat night landing. The usual snafu developed".

== Landing ==
=== First wave ===
USS APc-15 produced 140 mimeograph copies of the VII Amphibious Force operation order, which was distributed by PT boat. While the VII Amphibious Force was en route during the night, a Japanese raid on Buna sank an LCS(S), and damaged a dock and two merchant ships; nine people were killed and 27 wounded. USS LCI-31 developed engine trouble, and was forced to return to Buna. This left A Company of the 2/13th Infantry Battalion without its transport. The battalion commander, Lieutenant Colonel G. E. Colvin, arranged for them to travel on USS LCI-337, LCI-338, and LCI-342. Around sunset, six Sally bombers attacked the escorting destroyers. They dropped their bombs but scored no hits.

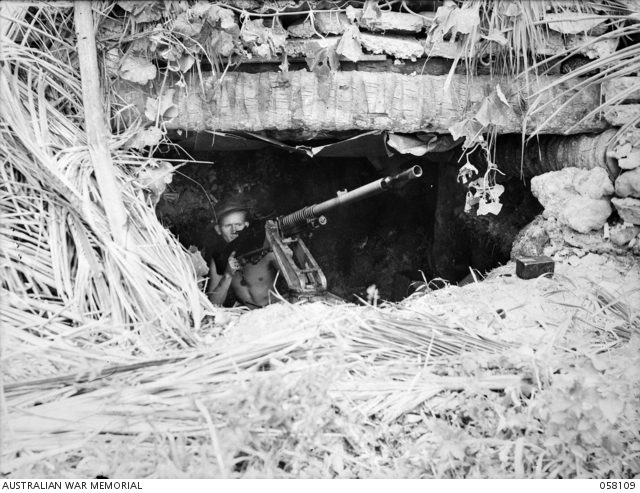
A type 1 heavy machine gun in a Japanese pillbox on the coast

The VII Amphibious Force arrived off Scarlet beach on time, and the destroyers conducted a short 11-minute preliminary bombardment. It was doubtful if any Japanese positions were hit or any casualties inflicted. Low cloud trapped the smoke and dust produced by the bombardment. To the Australians, it was "dark as the inside of a cow". Scarlet Beach and Siki Cove were covered by bunker-type pillboxes made of logs, spaced about 46 metres (50 yd) apart, and connected by shallow trenches. They held about 300 Japanese defenders. Japanese tracer fire started pouring from the shore. At this point, one Australian recalled "I realised that this was not an unopposed landing." It was the first opposed landing by Australian troops since the Landing at Anzac Cove in the Gallipoli Campaign of 1915.

Almost all the LCP(R)s in the first wave veered off course to the left, landing between Siki Creek and the rocks of the headland between Siki Cove and Arndt Point. All the boats landed successfully except for one carrying 11 Platoon of the 2/15th Infantry Battalion, which had broken down and was towed by the LCP(R) carrying 10 Platoon, delaying both. Another LCP(R) appeared and took the platoon in. But only three of the sixteen landed on Scarlet Beach. In some ways this was good, as it meant the plywood landing craft were not subjected to intense machine gun fire, which might have caused heavy casualties; but there were still serious disadvantages to landing on the wrong beach. On the right, Captain T. C. Sheldon's B Company, 2/17th Infantry Battalion, accompanied by the anti-tank platoon and two platoons of the Papuan Infantry Battalion, landed roughly where they were supposed to, and pushed on to their objective, North Hill.

The rest of the first wave was jumbled up. Major P. H. Pike found his A Company of the 2/17th mixed up with Captain Paul Deschamps' B Company of the 2/13th. Since the latter had further to travel, and there was no Japanese opposition, Pike agreed to hold his company back while Deschamps' moved on to his objective. Pike then moved his men inland 91 metres (100 yd) and waited for daylight. C Company's task was to seize Arndt Point, but part of it was already there, facing a steep cliff. The only platoon to encounter serious opposition was Lieutenant C. Huggett's platoon, which had veered off to the right, and landed on Scarlet Beach near the mouth of the Song River. It came under fire from two Japanese machine gun posts there. With the help of an American Amphibian Scout, Lieutenant Herman A. Koeln, Huggett attacked the posts with grenades and small arms. Another Amphibian Scout, Lieutenant Edward K. Hammer, encountered a party of Japanese that he fired on. Koeln and Hammer were conspicuous because they were carrying the 3.0-metre (10 ft) red canvas signs to mark the beach. The beachmaster, Lieutenant Commander John M. Band, was fatally wounded making his way to Scarlet Beach. He was posthumously awarded the US Navy Cross.

=== Follow-up ===
The second wave came in LCIs. These were craft that had no ramps; infantry disembarked from the down gangways. That they were not suitable for an assault landing was not overlooked, but they were all that was available. The first wave's mission was to capture Scarlet Beach and the foreshore. Since this had not been done, they came under fire from the Japanese bunkers. Despite explicit orders not to, they replied with their Oerlikon 20 mm cannon. Some helped to suppress the Japanese machine guns, while others fired wildly and caused casualties among the Australian troops ashore. Like the first wave, they veered off to the left, adding to the chaos. At least three of the LCIs grounded on a sand bar, but were able to retract and make better landings, although still on the wrong beach.

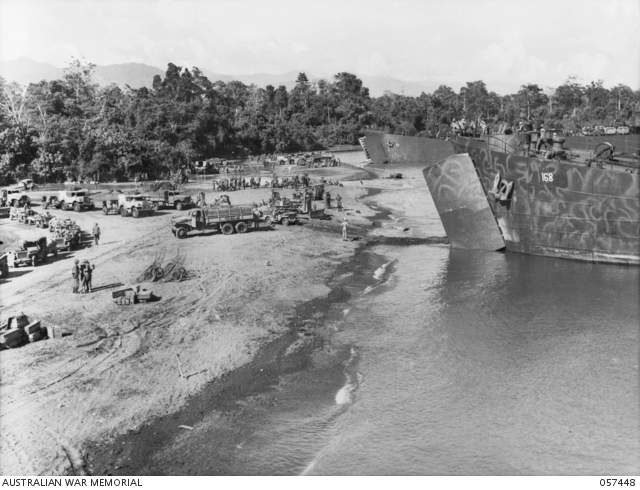
USS LST-168 unloads at Scarlet Beach

The Military Landing Officer, Major J. R. Broadbent, landed with the first wave in the same LCP(R) as Pike. With him was an Amphibian Scout carrying the red signal light that was to mark the centre of the beach for later waves. They were unable to reach the correct location in time for the second wave, but were able to place it and switch it on in time for the third, so it was the first to land on Scarlet Beach. Although the first wave had landed seven minutes late, the second was fifteen, and the third was half an hour behind schedule. In the confusion, two LCIs collided, killing two soldiers and injuring eight. Some of the LCI captains were reluctant to drive their ships in hard enough, and many troops disembarked into water that was over their heads. Sergeant Iaking Iwagu, of the Royal Papuan Constabulary, landing with 9 Platoon of the Papuan Infantry Battalion, was awarded the George Medal for attempting to save Captain A. B. Luetchford, who was hit in deep water. The third wave found the Japanese bunkers still manned, and assaulted them. Most of the Japanese defenders withdrew rather than fight to the finish.

Four LCMs of Lieutenant Colonel E. D. Brockett's Boat Battalion of the 532nd Engineer Boat and Shore Regiment carrying Bofors 40 mm guns were supposed to arrive with the second wave, but due to some navigational difficulties, they were an hour late. They came in with the six LCMs and four LCVPs of the fourth wave, which was itself 40 minutes late, arriving at 06:10. The 11 LCVPs of the fifth wave reached Scarlet Beach ten minutes later. By 06:30, the beach and the foreshore were clear of Japanese, and the destroyer transports and LCIs were on their way back to Buna. The amphibian engineers set up a portable surgical hospital to treat the wounded. Windeyer and his brigade major, Major B. V. Wilson, arrived in a landing craft from the destroyer USS Conyngham, and he established brigade headquarters in a Kunai patch 180 metres (200 yd) from the beach. A Japanese soldier threw a hand grenade at them that killed one man and wounded the brigade intelligence officer, Captain Barton Maughan. The Japanese soldier was killed with an Owen gun.

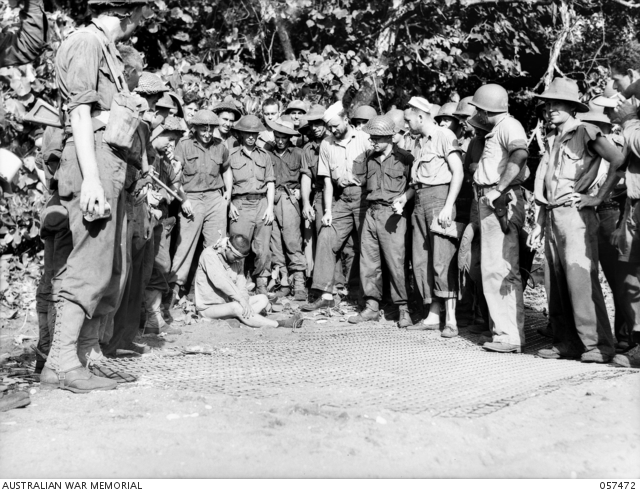
American and Australian troops with a Japanese prisoner captured in the landing at Scarlet Beach

The sixth and final wave consisted of LST-18, LST-168, and LST-204. They had instructions to wait until the smaller craft had cleared the beach, and beached at 06:50. Each carried an unloading party of 100 men, drawn from the 2/23rd and 2/48th Infantry Battalions, and 2/2nd Machine Gun Battalion, who would return with the LSTs. The unloading proceeded at a rapid pace. All the cargo was unloaded from two of the three when they retracted at 09:30, and headed off escorted by ten destroyers and the fleet tug USS Sonoma. The 2/3rd Field Company, 2/1st Mechanical Equipment Company, 2/3rd Pioneer Battalion, and the Shore Battalion of the 532nd Engineer Boat and Shore Regiment prepared four beach exits. Stores were quickly moved off the beach to inland dumps. Some 5,300 troops, 180 vehicles, 32 25-pounders and Bofors 40 mm guns, and 960 cubic metres (850 MTON) of bulk stores had been unloaded.

Fifth Air Force fighters provided air cover from 06:45. A Japanese reconnaissance aircraft flew over the beachhead at 09:10, and was shot down. A lone bomber showed up ten minutes later and attacked the LSTs on the beach, but missed. Two dive bombers attacked at 09:30, and were driven off, but not before inflicting casualties. The Bofors guns of the 10th Light Anti Aircraft Battery were attacked, and five men were wounded, one fatally. Over the next two weeks, there was at least one air raid on the beachhead every day. The air raids proved an effective way of clearing the beach. A large attack by 39 aircraft of the 4th Air Army ran into bad weather and had to return to Wewak, but a naval air forces attack with 38 Zeke fighters and eight Betty bombers found the LSTs and destroyers near the Tami Islands on their way back to Buna at 12:40. The fighter cover was being changed over, so the Fifth Air Force fighter controller on board the destroyer USS Reid could deploy five squadrons instead of just three. They claimed to have shot down 29 fighters and 10 bombers. Antiaircraft gunners from the destroyers, LSTs, and Sonoma also engaged the bombers. While torpedo wakes were seen, no hits were suffered. Three Lockheed P-38 Lightning fighters were shot down, but at least one pilot was rescued. The Japanese pilots claimed to have sunk two cruisers, two destroyers, and two transports.

=== Consolidation ===
A shortage of 9 mm ammunition for the Owen Guns was discovered, apparently because the ammunition was in the LST that was not completely unloaded. An emergency airdrop was requested at 10:30. In Port Moresby, the 1st Air Maintenance Company prepared 30 parachutes, each attached to two boxes containing 2,560 rounds of 9 mm ammunition, a total of 153,600 rounds. This was loaded onto three USAAF B-24 Liberator bombers at Wards Airfield that took off at 16:55. They arrived over the Finschhafen area after dark at 19:15, where a drop zone in a Kunai patch was marked by men holding hand torches. Of the 115,000 rounds that were dropped, about 112,000 were recovered.

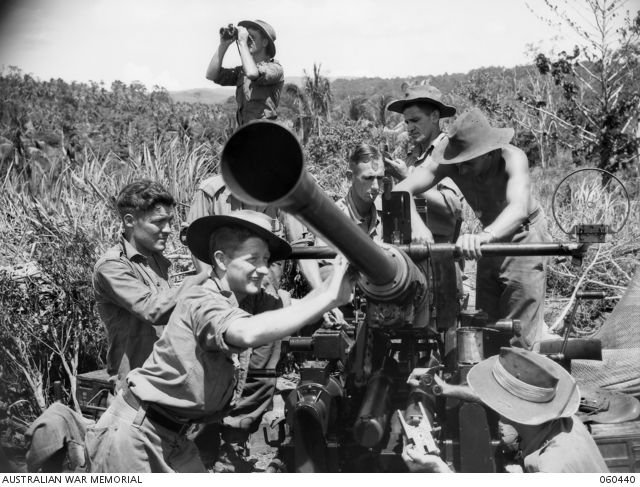
Bofors 40 mm gun of the 12th Battery, 2/4th Australian Light Anti-Aircraft Regiment

Around daybreak, Pike's A Company, 2/17th Infantry Battalion, reached the village of Katika, which turned out to be a clearing with some dilapidated huts. His company came under fire from Katika Spur, the high ground to the west, which was strongly held by the 9th Company, 80th Infantry Regiment and a company of the 238th Infantry Regiment. The Japanese attempted to outflank A Company on its left, but ran into Captain L. Snell's D Company, 2/15th Infantry Battalion.

The Japanese positions were well-sited on the spur for an attack from the east along the track from Katika to Sattelberg, but at this point, Captain B. G. Cribb, the commander of D Company, 2/13th Infantry Battalion, came on the radio and announced he was in contact with the Japanese to the west, and was going to attack from that direction. A furious fight ensued. The Japanese held their fire until the Australians were almost on top of them. Realising the position was stronger than he had thought, Cribb withdrew after suffering eight dead and twenty wounded. Windeyer ordered the 2/17th to bypass the position and proceed to its objective, the high ground south of the Song River. The 2/15th was ordered to attack Katika Spur. The attack was delivered at 15:15 after a preliminary bombardment by 3 inch mortars, but the Japanese defenders had withdrawn, leaving behind eight dead. By nightfall, most of the brigade was on their objectives.

The seventh wave, made up of USS LST-67, LST-452, and LST-454, arrived at Scarlet Beach at midnight. As with the previous wave, each carried an Australian labour force which unloaded the LSTs under the direction of the Shore Battalion. The LSTs retracted at 03:00 in order to be well clear before dawn. During the first day, Australian casualties were 20 killed, 65 wounded, and nine missing, all of whom were eventually found to be either dead or wounded. The VII Amphibious Force reported three of its men were wounded.

== Reinforcement ==
Blamey relinquished command of New Guinea Force on 22 September, handing over to Lieutenant General Sir Iven Mackay. As one of his final actions before returning to LHQ in Brisbane, Blamey instructed Herring to arrange for the reinforcement of Finschhafen with an extra brigade and 9th Division Headquarters. That day, though, MacArthur, who also returned to Brisbane on 24 September, had issued an instruction that operations at Finschhafen were "to be so conducted as to avoid commitment of amphibious means beyond those allotted". Barbey therefore declined to arrange for the reinforcement of Finschhafen. Mackay took up the matter with Carpender, who likewise demurred. MacArthur feared that committing additional resources would tie them up, and perhaps result in losses that would delay upcoming operations, relinquishing the initiative to the Japanese. Ironically, the delay in reinforcing Finschhafen would cause just that.

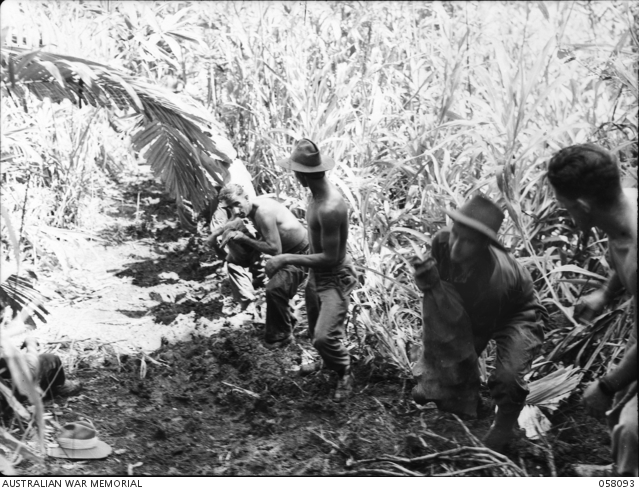
The rough terrain in the area necessitated these human supply chains to get ammunition and food to the forward troops

Windeyer sent a signal on 27 September asking for another infantry battalion and a squadron of tanks, and Carpender agreed to ship the additional battalion. The following day Herring flew to Milne Bay to confer with Barbey about this. On takeoff from Dobodura, the B-25 Mitchell he was travelling in crashed. A flying fragment killed his chief of staff, Brigadier R. B. Sutherland, instantly. Everyone else on board escaped shaken but unscathed. The meeting was cancelled. Willoughby still clung to his original estimate of 350 Japanese in the Finschhafen area, but MacArthur authorised the extra battalion. It was arranged that the first LST departing Lae on the night of 28/29 September would stop at G Beach and collect the 2/43rd Infantry Battalion and a platoon of the 2/13th Field Company, a total of 838 men. They were taken to Buna where they transferred to the destroyer transports USS Brooks, Gilmer, and Humphreys. The next night they made a run to Scarlet Beach. The troops were landed and 134 wounded were taken back, but surf conditions prevented the most seriously wounded from being evacuated.

While the 20th Infantry Brigade was engaged at Finschhafen, the 22nd Infantry Battalion, a Militia infantry battalion from Victoria, advanced along the coast from the Hopoi Mission Station east of Lae towards Finschhafen. This advance, "constituting a minor epic in New Guinea operations", traversed increasing difficult terrain. Supply using vehicles was impossible; the 22nd Infantry Battalion was supplied by boats of the 532nd Engineer Boat and Shore Regiment. Stores were dropped off at advanced beaches and then carried from there by civilian porters. The 22nd Infantry Battalion fought a number of skirmishes against the Japanese 2nd Battalion, 80th Infantry Regiment, which was under orders to withdraw. The 22nd Infantry Battalion therefore discovered a series of well-prepared and strong positions which were either unmanned or soon abandoned. Along the way two Type 41 75 mm Mountain Guns that had been disabled were found, along with the bodies of the six New Guinea civilians who had hauled the guns, who had been bound and shot. The battalion reached Dreger Harbour on 1 October, where it made contact with the 20th Infantry Brigade.

== Advance on Finschhafen ==
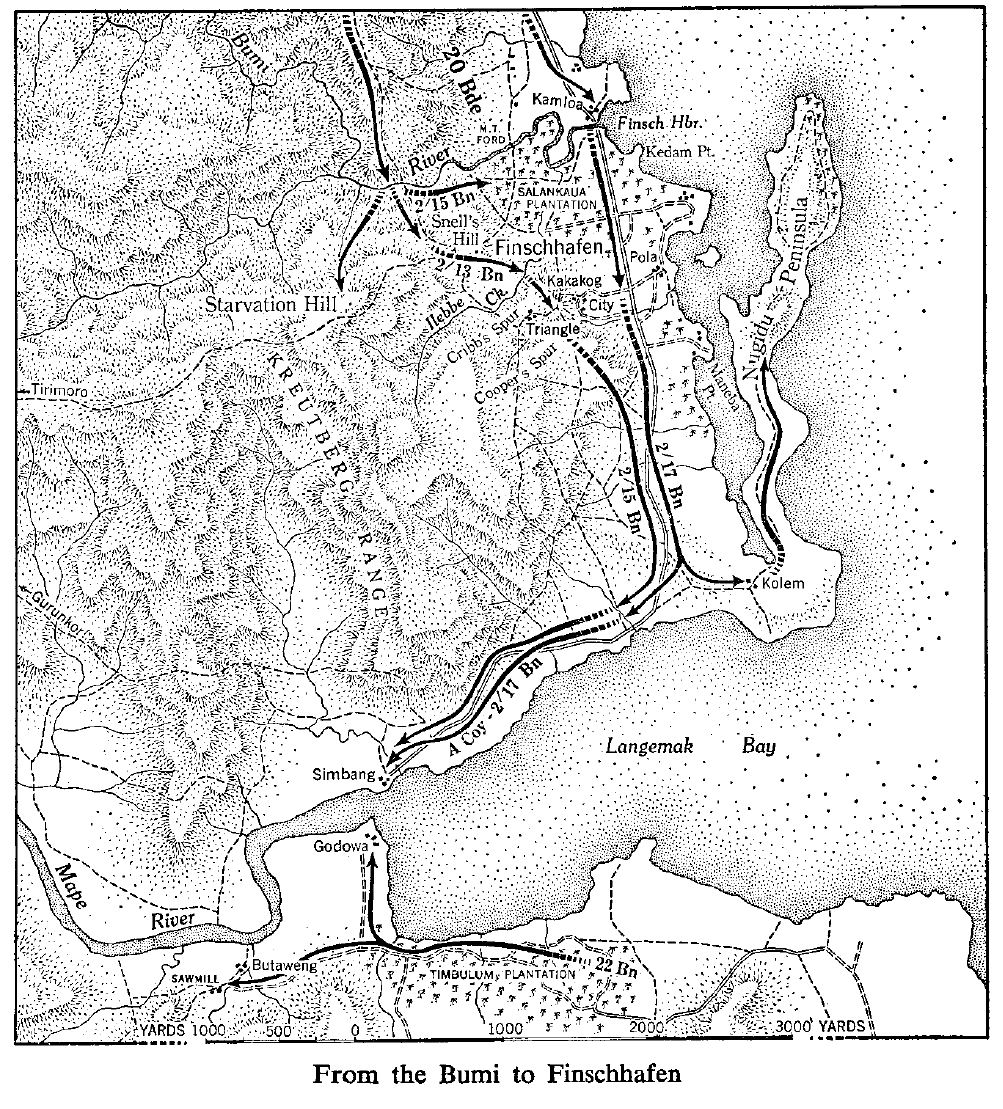
20th Infantry Brigade's advance on Finschhafen, September 1943

On 23 September, Windeyer ordered an advance on Finschhafen. Lieutenant Colonel Colin Grace's 2/15th Infantry Battalion reached the Bumi River at 12:40. It was 14 to 18 metres (15 to 20 yd) wide and appeared fordable, but the banks contained barbed wire and strongly fortified Japanese positions. While Yamada was withdrawing towards Sattelberg, the Japanese naval troops of the 85th Garrison Unit remained in place. Yamada had no authority over them, and their commander, Captain Tsuzuki, saw no reason to follow Yamada's actions. He intended to hold Finschhafen for as long as possible. Grace ordered Major Ron Suthers, who was acting as his second in command, to take B and D companies and outflank the Japanese position by moving through the foothills of the Kreutberg Range, as previously instructed by Windeyer. While not high, these hills were steep and covered in thick vegetation. There was no track, so the force had to cut its way through 800 metres of dense jungle.

Suthers reached the crest at 17:30 and an hour later halted on the ridge for the night, but he resumed his advance in the morning, reaching the Bumi River at 10:00. He found the north bank defended but the south occupied, so he attempted to find a crossing 140 metres (150 yd) upstream. A Japanese sniper with a light machine gun killed B Company's commander, Captain E. Christie, and Lieutenant N. Harphain. Suthers then ordered Snell to make an assault crossing with D Company. This was done at 13:30, with D Company crossing in waist-deep water. One man was killed in the crossing. During the afternoon, the 2/13th Infantry Battalion crossed the river to the bridgehead secured by B and D Companies.

A large Japanese air raid at 12:30 by 20 fighters and 12 bombers struck the Australian positions around Launch Jetty and the Finschhafen airstrip. About 60 bombs were dropped. There were heavy casualties. The 2/3rd Field Company lost 14 killed and 19 wounded; the 2/12th Field Regiment lost two killed and 16 wounded, and the air liaison party's headquarters was hit, knocking out its radio set and killing Captain Ferrel, its commander. Another eight men were killed and 40 wounded in air raids on 25 September. During the night of 25/26 September, Japanese barges and a submarine were spotted offshore. Windeyer had to send a company of the 2/17th Infantry Battalion back to protect the artillery.

Meanwhile, D Company of the 2/17th Infantry Battalion had moved along the track to Sattelberg with the intent of capturing that position. D Company reported Sattelberg was unoccupied, but in fact had captured Jivevenang, not Sattelberg. When the mistake was realised and it attempted to take Sattelberg, it was found to be strongly defended. D Company therefore withdrew to Jivevenang. Unfortunately, the news of the capture of Sattelberg was passed all the way up the line to GHQ in Brisbane.

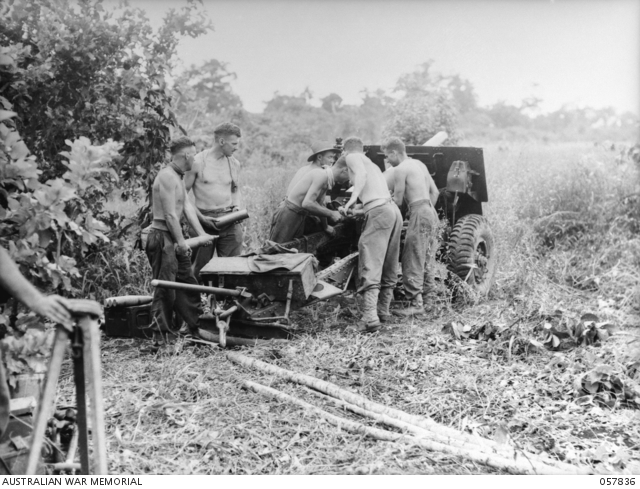
A 25-pounder of the 2/12th Australian Field Regiment shells the Kakakog area from the airstrip

The advance on Finschhafen continued on 26 September. Since the Salankaua Plantation was still reported to be heavily defended, Windeyer attempted to force the defenders to withdraw. He started with attacks on two hills to the south west of the plantation. B and D Companies of the 2/15th Infantry Battalion attacked what came to be called Snell's Hill. It was captured in hand-to-hand combat using bayonets. The Australians captured three 13 mm heavy machine guns and seven light machine guns, and buried the bodies of 52 dead Japanese defenders. The other feature, which came to be called Starvation Hill, was taken by C Company. However, their capture did not prompt the Japanese to leave the Salankaua Plantation.

Windeyer realised he needed to capture Kakakog Ridge. Torrential rain was falling, making it difficult to resupply the forward positions, particularly Starvation Hill. On 1 October eight Douglas A-20 Havoc bombers of the US 89th Bombardment Squadron attacked the Japanese positions in the Salankaua Plantation and Kakakog Ridge area at 10:35, followed by ten Vultee Vengeance dive bombers of No. 24 Squadron RAAF. This was followed by twenty 25-pounders of the 2/12th Field Regiment firing 30 rounds per gun.

The attack was delivered but the assault companies were soon pinned down. "When a situation seemed desperate", historian David Dexter noted, "the Australian Army appeared to have the knack of producing a leader of the necessary character". Sergeant G. R. Crawford led 11 and 12 Platoons of the 2/13th Infantry Battalion in a bayonet charge on the Japanese positions covering Ilebbe Creek. Private A. J. Rofle, firing a Bren gun from the hip, silenced one of the Japanese posts causing the most trouble. He went on to silence another, but was wounded trying to take out a third. Crawford's furious assault swept all before it. One post remained on Crawford's left, which was attacked with 2-inch mortars and attacked by 8 Platoon. The Japanese abandoned the post and withdrew into the Salankaua Plantation. Rolfe and Crawford were awarded the Distinguished Conduct Medal. The 2/13th Infantry Battalion lost 10 killed and 70 wounded; between 80 and 100 Japanese marines died.

The arrival of the 2/43rd Infantry Battalion at Scarlet Beach allowed the 2/17th Infantry Battalion to be reassembled for the advance on Finschhafen, enabling the entire 20th Infantry Brigade to concentrate on that objective. On 2 October the 2/17th Infantry Battalion crossed the Bumi without opposition, and found the Salankaua Plantation unoccupied. In mopping up the area, it captured two Japanese stragglers and killed three. By evening Finschhafen was in Australian hands. Between 22 September and 2 October, the 20th Infantry Brigade had taken its objectives. It had lost 73 dead, 276 wounded and nine missing, all of whom were later accounted for as dead or wounded. The 532nd Engineer Boat and Shore Regiment had eight dead and 42 wounded. Two Americans were also killed in the Air Liaison Party.

== Aftermath ==
MacArthur's decision to move swiftly against Finschhafen, coupled with Blamey's to envelop the Japanese defences by landing at Scarlet Beach, and Yamada's to avoid a decisive engagement that might result in the loss of all or part of his force, gave Windeyer the time and space he needed to take Finschhafen. Blamey's objective was therefore in Allied hands; but it was of limited use without Sattelberg. The Allied intelligence failure and subsequent dithering meant the Japanese reinforced their position faster, and thus were able to seize the initiative.

The Japanese launched a counter-attack on the Allied lodgement around Scarlet Beach on 16 October. A three-pronged action, the counter-attack saw a diversionary attack to the north while the Sugino Craft Raiding Unit attacked from the sea, and two infantry regiments assaulted the centre aiming towards the beach and the Heldsbach plantation. It was intended that once the beachhead was overwhelmed, the 79th and 80th Infantry Regiments would link up and clear the Finschhafen and Langemak Bay areas, but the assault was poorly co-ordinated and failed to achieve sufficient weight to overcome the Australians. The seaborne assault was interdicted by US Navy PT boats, which inflicted heavy casualties, and was then destroyed by Allied machine gunners on the beach. In the centre, though, the Japanese were able to break through to Siki Cove, and in the process isolated several Australian units, including those fighting on the western flank around Jivevenang, forcing the Australians to resort to air drops to keep their forces supplied.

While the Japanese briefly managed to force the Australians to contract their forces around the beachhead, and Japanese aircraft were able to attack the Allied ground troops around the area over three successive nights between 19 and 21 October, the attack ran out of momentum on 24 October. At this point, Yamada ordered his forces to concentrate around the high ground at Sattelberg, where they planned to make further attacks. Meanwhile, the Australians prepared for an assault against the Japanese stronghold that was established around the abandoned Lutheran mission atop the Sattelberg heights before advancing towards the Wareo plateau to cut off key Japanese lines of communication.
