= Battle of Wareo =

Part of the Huon Peninsula campaign of World War II

Coordinates: 6°27′S 147°47′E

- Part of the Huon Peninsula campaign of World War II
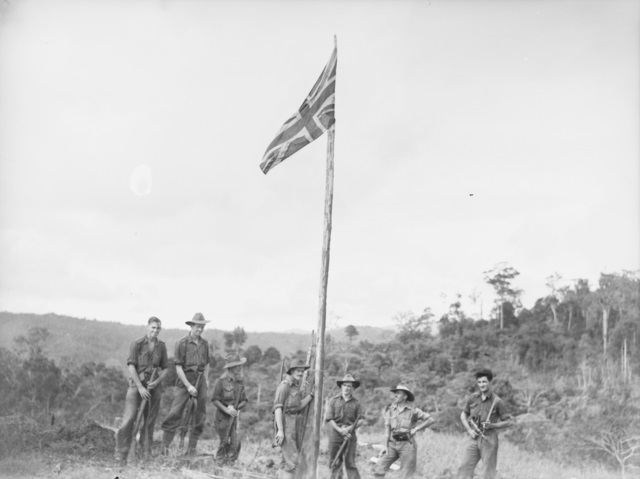
- Troops from the Australian 2/23rd Infantry Battalion raise the Union flag over Wareo, 9 December 1943
Date	27 November – 8 December 1943
Location	Wareo, Territory of New Guinea
Result	Allied victory

Belligerents
Australia	Japan

Commanders and leaders
(Australia) George Wootten	(Empire of Japan) Shigeru Katagiri

Units involved
(Australia) 9th Division: 4th Infantry Brigade; 20th Infantry Brigade; 24th Infantry Brigade; 26th Infantry Brigade	(Empire of Japan) 20th Division: 79th Infantry Regiment; 80th Infantry Regiment; 238th Infantry Regiment

Strength
~ 13,000	~ 4,600

Casualties and losses
47 killed, 332 wounded	451 killed and 1 captured

The Battle of Wareo (27 November – 8 December 1943) was fought by Australian and Japanese forces in New Guinea during the Huon Peninsula campaign of World War II in the later part of 1943. Coming after the capture of Sattelberg by the Allies, the battle took place amidst the Australian advance north towards Sio. The Australians committed elements from four infantry brigades from the Australian 9th Division with supporting elements including artillery, engineers and tank support, while the Japanese force consisted primarily of two depleted infantry regiments from the 20th Division, with limited artillery support.

The Australian advance in this region developed into three drives. In the west, forces advanced north from Sattelberg following its capture, while in the east, an advance was made from North Hill on the coast, north of Scarlet Beach, where the Australians had landed earlier in the campaign. A smaller drive was made in the centre from Nongora, which lay in between the two, although this was limited and subsequently linked up with the coastal drive. Although possessing significant forces, the Australian advance proved slow. Heavy rain and harsh terrain slowed the Australian resupply efforts and reduced the mobility of their manoeuvre elements. Disease and fatigue also heavily depleted their infantry, with more casualties being suffered from illnesses than combat.

The Japanese units in the area also defended strongly, but they too were short on supplies and in the end they were forced to withdraw further north. Wareo subsequently fell to the Allies on 8 December, who then established a line east from Wareo to Gusika on the coast. From there they carried out further advances north later in the month and into early January 1944.

== Background ==
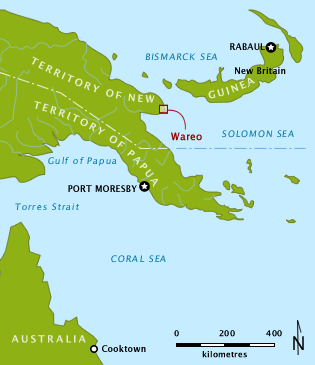
Map showing location Wareo, New Guinea

In September 1943, Australian forces launched the first phase of Operation Cartwheel, General Douglas MacArthur's advance on the main Japanese base at Rabaul. The operation initially went well. Lae fell on 16 September, and having advanced north along the coast towards the Huon Peninsula, the Australians had the Japanese forces on the back foot. On 22 September, elements of the Australian 9th Division, commanded by Major General George Wootten, landed at Scarlet Beach from where they began to fan out to the south and west to capture Finschhafen and to begin the advance towards Sio, further around the coast on the northern side of the Huon Peninsula.

Up to this point the Allied advance had been faster than planned, but at Finschhafen it faltered. The rapid advance had created logistical difficulties. In particular, the engineers required to develop the captured areas were not yet available. This became critical when heavy rains delayed the opening of the Lae–Nadzab Road. Without the road, the planned airbase at Nadzab could not be developed, and without the airbase, air cover could not be provided for another amphibious operation. MacArthur was forced to postpone the next phase of Cartwheel, Operation Dexterity, the landing on New Britain.

The initiative now passed to the Japanese. As the Australians advanced, a large force of Japanese – consisting largely of the 79th and 80th Infantry Regiments, part of the 26th Field Artillery Regiment and a battalion of the 238th Infantry Regiment, which were grouped together as the 20th Division under Lieutenant General Shigeru Katagiri – launched an unsuccessful counter-attack in October before retreating inland towards an abandoned German mission that sat atop a 900-metre (3,000 ft) peak at Sattelberg.

By 5 November, General Headquarters (GHQ) South West Pacific Area (SWPA) had decided that the Finschhafen area would be developed into a major air and naval base, but the large Japanese force on Sattelberg still overlooked the base area. In order to remove this threat, Wootten sent the 26th Infantry Brigade to capture Sattelberg on 16 November. On 25 November, after 10 days of fighting, and an advance up the southern approaches from Jivevaneng by infantry supported by artillery, armour and air support, Sattelberg was seized by the Australians. Having suffered heavy casualties, and short on supplies, the Japanese withdrew north to Wareo, where they established themselves in preparation for further attacks by the Australians.

== Logistics ==
=== Allied ===
Allied supplies were hauled from Lae in the Landing Craft, Vehicle, Personnel and Landing Craft Mechanised of the US 2nd Engineer Special Brigade, affectionately known as the "9th Division Navy". The capture of Dreger Harbour and Langemak Bay provided sheltered unloading areas, although they had not yet been developed into ports. This allowed the 2nd Engineer Special Brigade to make supply runs every second day. During October, its boats made 3,870 trips totalling 157,513 miles (253,493 km), and carried 5,930 troops and 26,573 long tons (26,999 t) of cargo.

These were supplemented by less frequent trips by the much larger Landing Craft Tank and Landing Ships Tank of the VII Amphibious Force, which brought up tanks and artillery pieces. Their capacity was not as great as it could have been because, due to fear of Japanese air attacks, they had to quickly unload in the darkness. Some 800 men were employed by day and 800 by night unloading craft on the beaches. By 1 November, there were 12,000 rounds of 25 pounder ammunition in the Finschhafen area, and stocks were increasing at a rate of two LCM loads per day. After unloading at Finschhafen, supplies were moved overland to where they were needed by jeeps, and where the terrain prevented this, by hand. In this regard, some New Guinean labourers were employed, but a shortage of such personnel resulted in the Australians allocating some of their combat troops to this role.

The wounded were taken to the aid posts and dressing stations in the field, and then to the 2/3rd Casualty Clearing Station, which arrived at Langemak Bay in October, or the 2/2nd Casualty Clearing Station, which opened at Heldsbach Plantation in November. Patients evacuated by sea on the small Australian Army hospital ship Stradbroke II, and later the improvised American Army hospital ship Norab. (Note: Norab (Baron backward) was the 103-foot-6-inch (31.5 m) 1928 built yacht owned by American club and hotel owner Baron Long. Leased to the Army the ship was operated by the U.S. Army's Small Ships (#S206) crewed largely by Australians. The vessel had been fitted with bunks for 64 stretcher cases and space for 100 walking wounded. See Lunney & Finch 1995, p. 145) Air evacuation began when the airstrip at Finschhafen was opened in December.

Large numbers of Australian and American troops began arriving in November to develop the base at Finschhafen. There were US Army engineers to develop the airbase, and US Navy Seabees to build a PT Boat base at Dreger Harbour. The Finschhafen Base Sub Area, under the command of Lieutenant Colonel H. T. Allan, was formed in November to support Australian operations in the area. Its American counterpart, known as Base F, followed on 15 November.

=== Japanese ===
The Japanese also relied upon water transport for logistics during the battle. Due to heavy shipping losses earlier in the year during the Battle of the Bismarck Sea, they employed a small force of submarines in an effort to avoid Allied air attack. Closer to the battle zone, barges were used to augment these submarines, but they too proved vulnerable to attack by Allied aircraft and PT boats. The distribution of Japanese supplies was hampered by the lack of native carriers, which the Japanese had been unable to recruit due to an Allied propaganda campaign in the region. In addition, there was a lack of motor transport and the track system was under developed. As a result, distribution of supplies once they had been landed was undertaken by resupply parties which were drawn largely from combat units. These parties moved overland on foot using a number of key tracks that existed north of the Wareo–Gusika ridge.

== Prelude ==
Shortly after the Australians had landed at Scarlet Beach in late September, they began to patrol the area north of there towards Bonga and Gusika. Several key tracks and junctions were located by troops from the 2/43rd Infantry Battalion, who named them "Imperial", "Oriental", "Norfolk" and "Exchange", after Adelaide pubs. Through the use of aerial reconnaissance evidence was found that the Japanese were using these tracks to traverse the area and to move supplies west towards Sattelberg. Observation posts were established and it became apparent to the Australians that one hill in particular, a feature later dubbed "Pabu" by the Australians after one of their native scouts, was the key terrain in the area. Part of an area that later became known as "Horace the Horse" to the Australians due to its shape as viewed from the air, it was within artillery range of the Australian forward positions at North Hill and as such could be occupied and held by a small party who could then disrupt the Japanese supply line. In October, the Japanese had launched a counter-attack in the region and as the Australians had been forced back, they were forced to abandon Pabu.

The October counter-attack was turned back. The commander of the Japanese XVIII Army, Lieutenant General Hatazō Adachi, visited Katagiri's command post, and ordered a renewal of the attack, which Katagiri scheduled for 23 November. Meanwhile, the Australians sought to regain the initiative. Wootten decided to establish a position in depth behind the Japanese forward line, and subsequently further efforts were made to establish a force at Pabu in front of the Australian forward line at North Hill. Three companies from the 2/32nd Infantry Battalion under Major Bill Mollard, were sent to occupy it in mid-November, and after striking north of the Song River from North Hill, with the help of native scouts, they moved between the Japanese positions as "Exchange" and "Pino Hill". Following a heavy bombardment from the field guns of the 2/12th Field Regiment firing from Heldsbach Plantation, they captured the position. Over the next few days, the Australians established themselves, and began patrolling operations. After bringing up mortars and Vickers medium machine guns, they began to attack the Japanese resupply parties moving through the area, inflicting heavy casualties.

As a result of the occupation of Pabu, and the general movement of Australian forces towards Wareo–Bonga, the Japanese infantry were threatened with being trapped. In response, the Japanese commander, Katagiri, diverted some of the effort away from the recapture of Finschhafen, and resolved to recapture the North Hill–Pabu area. A strong force of Japanese subsequently advanced south along the coastal track from Bonga, attempting to retake North Hill and the ground north of the Song River. Commencing on 22 November, the Japanese made heavy assaults around North Hill, on positions which were defended by Australians from the 2/43rd Infantry Battalion and the 2/2nd Machine Gun Battalion. The 2/32nd, with two companies isolated to the north around Pabu, was also in the thick of the fighting, and over the space of 10 days it was subjected to repeated attacks. Despite being short of food and receiving repeated mortar fire, the 2/32nd held its ground with the assistance of strong artillery support, and in doing so inflicted heavy casualties upon the Japanese. Later at least 195 bodies were found around the 2/32nd's position; their own losses amounted to 25 killed and 51 wounded. The Japanese commanding general, Hatazo Adachi, later pinpointed the Australian capture of Pabu Hill as one of the main reasons for the defeat of his force during the Huon Peninsula campaign.

The Japanese counter-attacks were eventually repulsed and after this, the Australians resumed their advance. The plan called for a three-pronged attack by a divisional sized force of around 13,000 men. While the 26th Infantry Brigade advanced to Wareo, the 24th Infantry Brigade took up a position on their right with the intention of capturing the area from Gusika on the coast to the "Lakes", two large water features about 2 miles (3.2 km) inland. The 20th Infantry Brigade advanced in the centre between the 24th and 26th Infantry Brigades, striking out for Wareo from Nongora. Meanwhile, the 4th Infantry Brigade was assigned to defend the Allied beachhead around Finschhafen and Heldsbach, although it would later be employed in the coastal drive.

== Battle ==
=== Pursuit of Japanese forces to Bonga ===
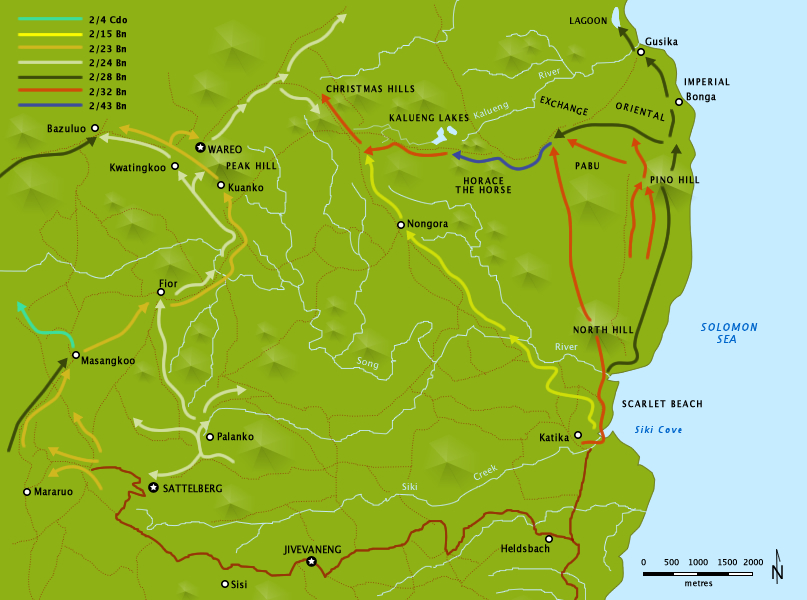
Battle of Wareo, 1943

Along the coast, the 2/28th Infantry Battalion was assigned the task of leading the Australian advance along with a troop from the 1st Tank Battalion and engineers from the 2/7th Field Company. Commencing in the afternoon of 27 November, they began clearing operations between Bonga and North Hill along the coast with a secondary task of sending a company towards Pabu to facilitate the relief of the 2/32nd. In the vicinity, the Japanese 20th Division, consisting of the remnants of the 79th, 80th and 238th Infantry Regiments, numbered 4,670 men, of which 2,500 were combat effective. The lead company of the 2/28th Infantry Battalion moved off shortly after midday, passing through the 2/43rd Infantry Battalion's lines. Initially there was no opposition and by the afternoon they established a defensive position near a waterfall. The following morning, the advance continued. The ground astride the coastal track, although flat, was covered in dense jungle, which was not suitable for tracked vehicles to move across. The result of this was that the Australian tanks had to remain on the track, advancing behind the infantry, which limited the rate of their advance and prevented them from being able to apply the full weight of their firepower.

As the Australians advanced, the engineers used bulldozers to improve the track to facilitate the flow of supplies, nevertheless the advance was slow. Sabotage of the bridges that spanned the various creeks that crossed the track held up the tanks, which were forced to wait while engineers came forward. While a bridge was being prepared for the tanks to cross a stream, attempts were made to attack the Japanese with infantry, however the ground was too rough and hard to penetrate and after suffering two casualties, the attack was called off. The Japanese attempted to delay the oncoming Australian units with snipers and suicide actions, however the supporting fire from the Australian tanks, which had joined the combat after crossing the stream and which at some points closed to 100 yards (91 m) to fire at the Japanese, was used effectively where Japanese resistance was heaviest. In the face of this, the Japanese fell back. At the same time, a platoon advanced north from Pabu and occupied a position named "Exchange" by the Australians, capturing a 75 mm artillery piece in the process.

The two companies from the 2/32nd Infantry Battalion around Pabu had been reinforced by the remaining two companies which had fought their way through on 26 November, having also captured "Pino Hill" with four Matilda tanks and artillery support. They were then relieved by the 2/43rd, who were warned out to begin an advance to the west. The following morning, 29 November, the 2/28th Infantry Battalion once again led the Australian advance. By mid-morning Bonga had been taken and shortly after midday, Australian reconnaissance patrols found Gusika undefended and so the main body subsequently occupied a local feature called "Oriental" to its south. It was the site of a large Japanese headquarters, but was found to be abandoned, with piles of equipment left behind.

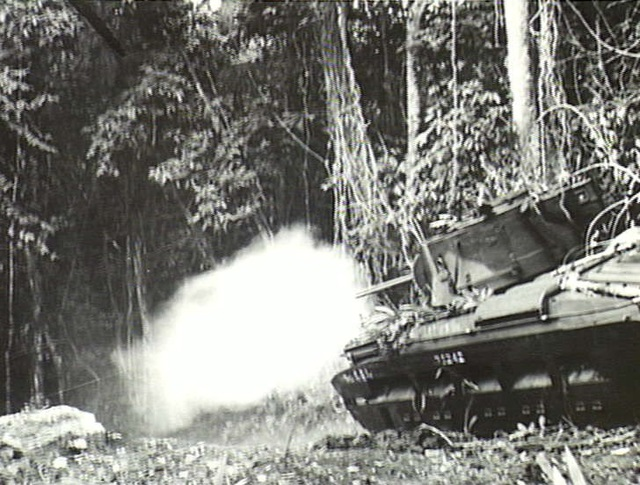
A Matilda tank of A Squadron, 1st Tank Battalion, fires at a Japanese foxhole.

The fall of Bonga put the Japanese forces firmly on the back foot; their supply route through Bonga having been cut, they had to send supplies and reinforcements along the rough track that passed between Kiligia and Wareo. The next step for the Australians was the capture of Gusika to the north on the coast and a position known as "Horace's Ears" further inland to the west. To that point, the advance had been going well for the Australians, so they split their forces, with the 2/28th pushing on to Gusika and the 2/43rd turning west towards "Horace". At this point the Australian forces received a boost in the form of the 4th Infantry Brigade, which was assigned to the 9th Division to begin the advance north up the coastal track towards the high features that existed around Fortification Point. At the same time, the 24th Infantry Brigade would advance on Wareo from Bonga, in the east.

The terrain over which the two brigades were to advance was generally steep with the track having been cut along a high spur line that dropped on either side into deep ravines that were covered by kunai grass interspersed with areas of thick jungle. North of Bonga, the ground was markedly different, with the track having been pushed through flat swamp land that was punctuated by many deep creeks; vegetation in the area was mainly thick secondary growth, although to the west, in the steep hills, kunai grass was predominate. As a result of the harsh conditions and terrain, as the Australian advance continued it was increasingly hampered by vehicle break downs and fatigue amongst their crews. Resupply was also a problem for the Australians and consequently a lack of spare parts developed. This meant that a number of jeeps became unserviceable and some of the Matilda tanks were unable to advance for some time while their crews waited for parts to be brought up.

=== Japanese stand at Horace's Ears ===
By 30 November, the Australian commander, Wootten, had concentrated a significant force, consisting of 12 infantry battalions, a machine gun battalion, a Matilda tank squadron, a battalion of pioneers, a squadron of commandos, and artillery and engineer support, and was ready to begin the next stage of the advance. The advance began that morning with the 2/28th Infantry Battalion advancing on the Australian right in concert with the Matildas from 3 Troop, 1st Tank Battalion. Crossing the Kalueng River, they penetrated only 0.25 miles (0.40 km) before meeting Japanese resistance, which was overcome with the assistance of an artillery barrage and mortars. At the same time, the 2/43rd, which had relieved the 2/32nd around Pabu earlier, also advanced. Two companies were sent out late in the afternoon, each with armoured support in the shape of two Matildas, tasked with taking the position known by the Australians as "Horace's Ears" by advancing through an area of low ground dubbed "Lilac Valley" by the Australians.

The Japanese had developed the position considerably, establishing a complex defensive network and, whereas up until that point they had usually withdrawn in the face of the advancing Australians, they decided to make a stand. Employing a 75 mm gun, which was fired over open sights due to the closeness of the fighting, along with some 37 mm guns and a number of machine guns of varying calibre, they fought fiercely. Halted by fire, the Australians called in fire support to overwhelm the Japanese with fire superiority, and resorting to employing the indirect method that would characterise their operations during this phase of the advance, and which was necessitated by the depleted state of their forces. Moving up a steep slope that was covered by kunai grass, one of the tanks broke down, nevertheless the Australian armour was able to deliver a significant bombardment which enabled the infantry to take the position early in the evening.

=== Kalueng Lakes ===
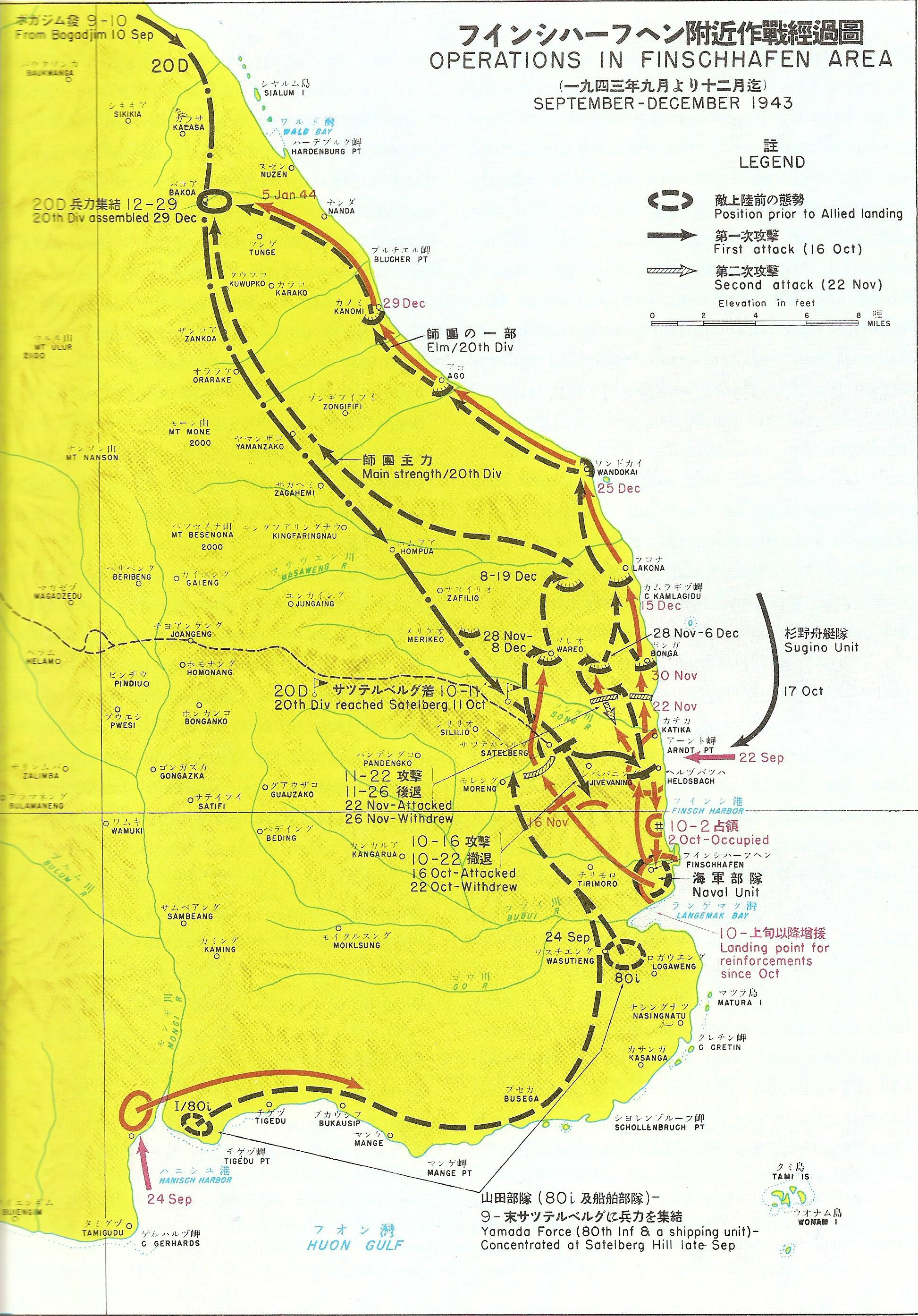
Operations in the Finschhafen area

The 2/28th Infantry Battalion put a patrol over the Kalueng River on 1 December. The previous day artillery had been used to reduce the Japanese presence in the area of the "Lagoon" – north of Gusika – and, as a consequence, the patrol was able to penetrate deep to the north, almost reaching the Lagoon before turning around. On the return leg, the Australians located a Japanese position and attacked it, killing one and wounding three others before skirting around the position and moving south in an effort to regain Australian lines. A second Japanese force, however, blocked their way and after a firefight at sunset in which a further three Australians were wounded, they were forced back to the north, where they established a defensive position. Runners were sent out to take a message through to the battalion headquarters. Both men never made it, though, being killed after encountering several Japanese. After darkness fell and it began to rain, the patrol, however, was able to extricate itself back to the river where they spent the night before rejoining their battalion early on 2 December.

The troop of tanks that had initially been committed was at this point relieved, with another – an ad hoc formation drawn from Headquarters Troop and 2 Troop from the 1st Tank Battalion – being brought up to replace them. In concert with a company from 2/43rd, five tanks struck out from Pabu on 2 December. The tanks were kept in reserve at this stage and one broke down early in the advance. Together, the force penetrated close to the Lakes, but a Japanese force moved to cut off their rear, forcing them back. A second company from the 2/43rd, also with tank support, was then thrown forward to conduct a move to flank towards the larger of the two water features, approaching from the south. The Japanese were positioned in strength in a heavily wooded area and began firing on the Australians with machine guns, which pinned them down until two tanks came up and destroyed the Japanese position, firing from point blank range. At this point, the Australians lost another tank, which became bogged in the mud and which had to be left with an infantry guard to defend it while the advance continued.

By mid-afternoon, the 2/43rd's second company's advance was checked again, having progressed a further 100 metres (110 yd). At this point, the last tank, named "Costello" by its crew, moved forward to provide support. As it came up past the infantry, it was fired upon from Japanese artillery positioned on some high ground to the north of the lake. It was initially fired upon by a 37 mm gun, which fired from about 50 metres (55 yd) away, before that was joined by 75 mm artillery piece. Despite being hit more than 50 times, the tank's crew remained unhurt and were able to keep firing the tank's 2 pounder until they eventually had to abandon the tank and fall back with the infantry. At this point, the Australians withdrew.

Overnight, the Japanese pulled the two guns off the high ground and left a small force behind which was quickly overwhelmed by the Australians when they resumed their advance the following day. The Australian infantry suffered further casualties when they approached the previously abandoned "Costello" and triggered a mine that had been set by the withdrawing Japanese. The advance was slow, though, and in order to support the 2/43rd, the 2/32nd was brought forward again. Together the composite force overcame the Japanese resistance around the Lakes around midday on 3 December, and at this point they were re-tasked with taking over the drive in the central sector from the 20th Infantry Brigade, which was to be rested for later in the campaign, and pushing on to the Christmas Hills.

=== Nongora and Christmas Hills ===
Although originally the whole 20th Infantry Brigade had been assigned the task of advancing through the Australian centre towards Nongora, in the end only one infantry battalion, the 2/15th, and a platoon from the Papuan Infantry Battalion was committed. Stepping off on 30 November, this force struck north from Nongora towards the Song River. The lead company crossed the river west of a fjord and shortly after completing this manoeuvre, a force of Japanese engaged them with machine gun fire, killing one and wounding three others. Still in contact, the Australian company secured the crossing enabling two other companies from the 2/15th to come across. While the lead company fixed the Japanese position, the other two conducted a passage of lines manoeuvre and bypassed the Japanese machine gun position as they continued the advance towards Nongora. The lead company then also broke contact and followed them, and in the early afternoon, finding themselves confronted by a high feature to their front which blocked their path east towards Nongora, they established a defensive position short of their objective; meanwhile, the 2/15th's fourth company, following up in reserve, found the Japanese machine gun position abandoned and subsequently occupied it.

On 1 December, the Australians began to prepare to capture the high ground to their front. Japanese had been seen atop it and in the early afternoon a company-level attack was put in on the southern end of the feature. Suffering 13 casualties, the Australians were beaten back, however, during the night the Japanese withdrew from the ridge. The following day, the Australians discovered this and began following them up; by midday they had entered Nongora and established themselves there. Once this was completed, the 2/15th began to send out patrols to the west to probe the Christmas Hills, and to the east towards the Kalueng Lakes, to make contact with the 24th Infantry Brigade. This was affected the following day. At the same time, the 2/15th probed the Christmas Hills area, where they were engaged by the Japanese about 900 yards (820 m) south of the feature, with one of their officers being killed. Another patrol was sent out by the 2/15th in the early afternoon of 4 December. Advancing on the eastern side of the main track they were able to penetrate deep towards the hills, before finding their way barred by a deep gorge which forced them to turn back.

At this point, the Australian commander issued a new operation order, reassigning the task of capturing the Christmas Hills area to the 24th Infantry Brigade and pulling the 20th Infantry Brigade back to Nongora to rest up for the next phase of the campaign, which would see them advance up the coast. The strain of the advance along the coastal route, which had been the 24th Infantry Brigade's main effort, however, had taken its toll. As a result, the 2/32nd Infantry Battalion was called forward again as the 2/28th was plagued by sickness and the 2/43rd was physically worn out. On the night of 4/5 December, the Japanese withdrew from their forward positions, leaving behind a large quantity of equipment and their dead. The following morning, a composite force of Australians from the 2/32nd and 2/43rd Infantry Battalions then took up the advance towards the Christmas Hills, ranging west, and undertaking a series of flanking moves in order to break into the Japanese main defensive position, where the Japanese were well-entrenched. A firefight ensued in which six Japanese and seven Australians were killed, before the Australian attack was turned back.

On 6 December the Australians attacked again, this time with two companies approaching from the north-east, using an intense artillery and mortar bombardment to prepare the area first; the attack was repulsed with heavy fire. A further barrage rained down on the Japanese and by sunset, the 2/32nd Infantry Battalion, severely depleted with most its companies – several of which were commanded by junior non commissioned officers due to heavy casualties amongst the subalterns – at platoon strength, had managed to establish a lodging near the top of the feature on its eastern approach. That night the Japanese fell back from the position and the following day the Australians occupied Christmas Hills.

=== Drive on Kuanko and Wareo ===
In the west, the 26th Infantry Brigade had begun patrolling operations north of Sattelberg on 27 November, moving towards the Song River. The distance to Wareo was 6,000 yards (5,500 m), but due to the type of terrain, the actual distance to be traversed was about quadruple that. The 2/23rd Infantry Battalion was given the task of leading the Australian advance in this sector and after striking north from Masangkoo, they moved towards Fior, with the task for finding a river crossing for the brigade. No crossing could be found. At the same time the 2/24th set out from Palanko in search of jungle tracks towards the river. Flank protection on the left was provided by the 2/4th Commando Squadron and a platoon from the Papuan Infantry Battalion. The search was unsuccessful and after minor clashes occurred, the Australians dispatched two platoons to Fior in an effort to link up with the 2/23rd. Short of Fior, the Japanese had established themselves in strength in well dug-in positions amidst a thick bamboo grove. As the 2/24th's platoons approached, they were fired upon and forced to halt their advance, establishing a night defensive position.

During the night the Japanese withdrew silently and moved back across the Song, destroying the suspension bridge that spanned it as they went. They established themselves on the opposite side of the river and waited for the Australians to follow after them. The next morning, when the two Australian battalions rose they discovered that the ground in front of them was undefended and they advanced unopposed towards Fior. The 2/23rd advanced down the steep escarpment towards Fior, descending some 2,300 feet (700 m) into the valley through which the river flowed, crossing several creeks and entering the undefended town. The lead company from the 2/23rd Infantry Battalion then exploited towards the river, looking for a crossing. They found the bridge near the main crossing destroyed and about 150 yards (140 m) from the river, began receiving fire from the opposite bank. The Australians then sent out patrols to scout other potential crossings; one was found and by the early evening the Australians had established themselves on the other side of the Song.

Early on 30 November, the single company from the 2/23rd that had made it across the Song was joined by another. Together they moved up the steep slope to the Kuanko Track where they split up: one company went north to continue the advance, while the other turned to the south to attack the Japanese that had fired upon them earlier, taking them from the rear. Two attacks were put in against the rearguard of this position, achieving a break-in, which was then exploited by a platoon, which attacked with fixed bayonets, capturing the position. A total of 30 Japanese were killed or wounded in the attack and a short time later, the rest of the 2/23rd was able to exploit the main river crossing. Meanwhile, the company that had struck north continued to advance. They were about 900 yards (820 m) north of the river when their advance was checked, at which point the 2/23rd formed a defensive harbour to wait out the night.

Late that afternoon, after about a week of dry weather, it began to rain. As a result, the track became more difficult and mobility was reduced; the tanks found the track impassable and as a consequence the advancing Australian infantry lost their direct fire support. Resupply also proved to be a problem for them. The jeeps that had been bringing up supplies could not get forward and there were not enough native porters to meet the demand. As a result, the Australians had to resort to using one of their infantry battalions, the 2/24th, to bring supplies forward from Palanko while the 2/23rd continued the advance on Kuanko. Several isolated pockets of Japanese defenders were located along the track holding and so, while their sister battalion struggled up and down the steep track under the weight of their portage, on 1 December elements of the 2/23rd, leaving their heavy stores and equipment behind, advanced up a steep, muddy slope and set about clearing these positions. The Japanese resistance was overwhelmed and by midday the Australians entered Kuanko. Exploiting beyond the village in the afternoon, the lead Australian company took fire from a ridge line to the north-west and the advance was halted for the day.

The next morning the Australians sent out patrols and as they probed forward through the dense bamboo it became apparent to them that the Japanese had established themselves in strength along a ridge line that stretched off to a position called Peak Hill. In response to the Australian patrols, the Japanese raked the jungle with machine gun fire to which the Australians responded by calling in an artillery and mortar bombardment. As the sun began to set, the Japanese launched a quick attack on the lead Australian company, forcing them back. In order to regain the initiative, the 2/23rd Infantry Battalion launched a night attack, which, although supported by very accurate artillery fire from the 2/12th Field Regiment, proved unsuccessful. As a result of the failed attack, in the morning the Australians found themselves in a position overlooked by the Japanese. Throughout the day, both sides exchanged sniper fire and the Australians had to re-route their supply lines after they came under fire from the high ground. A company from the 2/24th was released from their portage tasks and were brought up to bolster the 2/23rd, taking up a position to the south in close proximity. During the night, however, the Japanese began to encircle the Australian position. In response, the company from the 2/24th moved to link up with the 2/23rd. Just short of the position, their advance was checked when they came under heavy fire; the Australians eventually managed to send out a patrol which outflanked the Japanese positions and linked up with the 2/23rd.

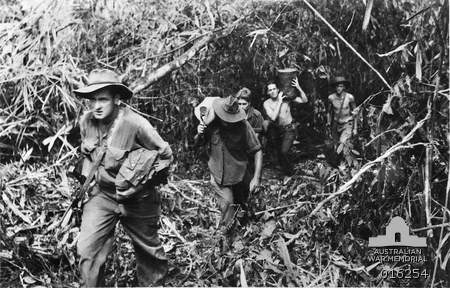
Australian troops from the 2/24th Infantry Battalion carry supplies up from Sattelberg towards the 2/23rd Infantry Battalion as they advanced towards Wareo

By 5 December, the Australians had managed to stockpile enough supplies in forward areas to enable the 2/24th Infantry Battalion, which had been engaged in moving the stores, to be released from this task and thrown back into the fighting. In order to bypass the Japanese position, elements from the 2/23rd along with one company from the 2/24th carried out flanking manoeuvres to the west of the track were undertaken before the Australians established themselves in defensive positions short of Peak Hill. On 6 December, the remaining three companies of the 2/24th came up and as the Australians continued to advance towards Peak Hill they found considerable Japanese positions which had been abandoned. As movement was seen in Wareo, which was visible in the distance, an artillery bombardment was called in by the Australians. In the afternoon, the Australians cut the branch track that turned towards Kwatingkoo before an attack was put in on Peak Hill. The Japanese defences held and the attack beaten off, the Australians attempted to outflank to the north but they were prevented from doing so by the thick jungle and as the sun set, they had to be content to dig-in on the western approach to Peak Hill.

Once again the Japanese withdrew during the night and early the following morning, 7 December, the Australians were able to capture the hill. Throughout the morning, they continued to advance until they were halted by fire about 600 yards (550 m) from Wareo. A brief halt was called at this time, while patrols were sent out to Kwatingkoo to determine the strength of the Japanese there. It was found to be heavily defended. Later in the day, elements of the 2/24th and the 2/32nd established contact, forming a link between the 24th and 26th Infantry Brigades. At this point fatigue amongst the Australians stalled their advance; it did not last long, though, and early on 8 December Kwatingkoo was captured by elements of the 2/24th Infantry Battalion without opposition as its defenders had fallen back earlier. Follow up moves advanced them towards Wareo and by mid-morning it too had been captured.

== Aftermath ==
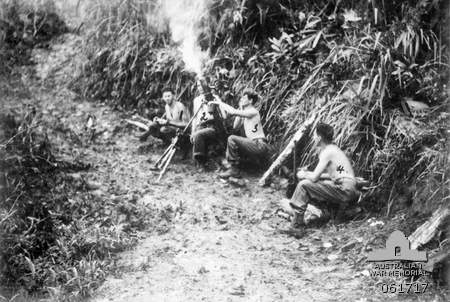
Mortars from the Australian 2/23rd Infantry Battalion bombard Japanese positions along the Wareo–Bonga track

The Australian advance had been hampered by bad weather, steep terrain, supply problems, fatigue and the strong defence mounted by the Japanese, nevertheless they had secured the Wareo–Gusika spur and the track that ran between Wareo and Bonga. In the face of the Australian advance on Wareo, early in December the Japanese commander, Katagiri, had ordered his troops, who were weary from the fighting and hungry due to a lack of supplies, to fall back to the north. The 79th Infantry Regiment, which had been defending the area around the Lakes, was ordered to move back to Kalasa and Sio, while the 80th Infantry Regiment, having been located around Kuanko, followed the 79th and moved east towards the coast.

The Australians were also in need of rest and were suffering heavily from tropical diseases, which had inflicted more casualties than Japanese actions in this phase of the campaign. Nevertheless, after the fall of Wareo, fighting in the area continued. In order to enable the two main Japanese infantry regiments to make a clean break, the 2nd Battalion, 238th Infantry Regiment, carried out rearguard operations in the Wareo area until 15 December. On 8 December, shortly after the capture of Kwatingkoo, a company from the 2/24th Infantry Battalion was ambushed while moving towards Bazuluo; eight Australians were killed and another four wounded.

A strong force of Japanese also held out on the 2200 feature, which lay about 1,700 yards (1,600 m) north-east of Wareo, threatening the Australian hold on the newly won Wareo–Bonga track. On 12 December, the fighting in the Wareo region intensified briefly when a significant clash occurred on the hill. Concerned about the presence of the Japanese rearguard, the Australians sent a force from the 2/24th Infantry Battalion to assault the Japanese that were ensconced there. A pitched battle followed in which 27 Japanese and three Australians were killed, before the Australians captured the position.

Elsewhere, the Allies landed at Arawe on New Britain on 15 December, while the Australian 4th Infantry Brigade, having commenced its advance up the coast from Gusika on 3 December, continued on passing through Bald Hill, Lakona and Kiligia on its way to Fortification Point as it led the opening phase of the Australian advance towards Sio. In late December, the 20th Infantry Brigade, which had largely been rested during the advance on Wareo, took over from the 4th. After sweeping up the coast quickly against light Japanese resistance, they captured Sio in early January 1944, having suffered only very light casualties.

After the war, the Australian Army commemorated the battle, and the fighting that occurred on its periphery, through the awarding of a number of battle honours: "Pabu", "Gusika", "Wareo" and "Nongora". The 2/32nd and 2/43rd Infantry Battalions both received "Pabu", while the 2/28th was awarded "Gusika". The 1st Tank Battalion and the 2/23rd and 24th Infantry Battalions received "Wareo", and "Nongora" went to the 2/15th. Casualties during the capture of Wareo and Gusika over the 26 November to 7 December period were reported by the Australian II Corps Headquarters as follows: 451 Japanese killed, as well as 40 found dead, and one captured. Against this, 47 Australians were killed and 332 were reported wounded.
