= 2/17th Battalion (Australia) =

Former infantry battalion of the Australian Army

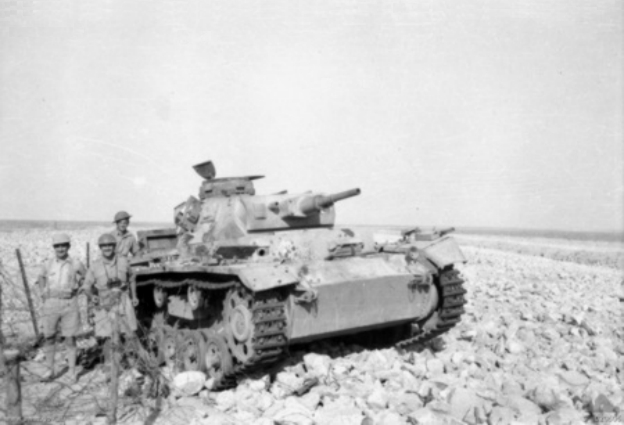
- A destroyed Panzer III near Tobruk, 1941, beside which the 2/17th's commanding officer, John Crawford, is standing.
- Active: 1940–1946
- Country: Australia
- Branch: Australian Army
- Role: Infantry
- Size: ~800–900 men (Note: By the start of World War II, the authorised strength of an Australian infantry battalion was 910 men all ranks, however, later in the war it fell to 803.)
- Part of: 20th Brigade, 9th Division
- Motto(s): What We Have We Hold
- Colours: White and green
- Engagements: World War II: North African campaign; Salamaua–Lae campaign; Huon Peninsula campaign; Borneo campaign

Commanders
- Notable commanders: John Crawford; John Broadbent; Maurice Fergusson

Insignia
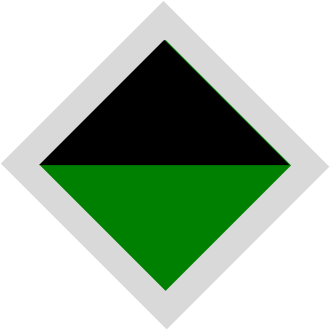
- Unit colour patch (1940–42)

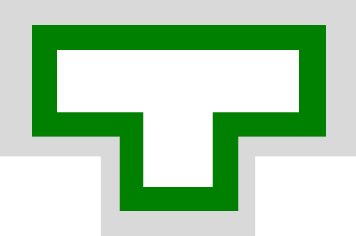
- (1942–46)

The 2/17th Battalion was an infantry battalion of the Australian Army. Raised in April 1940 in New South Wales, it formed part of the 20th Brigade, and was eventually allocated to the 9th Division. After completing basic training in Australia, the unit was deployed to the Middle East. In early 1941, it took part in the fighting at Tobruk, defending the port until relieved. A period of garrison duties followed in Syria and Lebanon before the battalion took part in the First and Second Battles of El Alamein in mid-1942. As the focus of the Australian Army's operations shifted to the Pacific theatre to fight the Japanese, the 2/17th Battalion returned to Australia early in 1943.

In 1943–1944, the battalion fought in New Guinea, conducting an amphibious landing as part of operations to capture Lae in early September at the end of the Salamaua–Lae campaign, before participating in the follow-up landing on the Huon Peninsula as Japanese forces withdrew inland from Lae. In early 1944, the battalion was withdrawn to Australia for rest and reorganisation and a long period of inactivity followed before it returned to combat. Its final campaign came late in the war when it was committed to the fighting in Borneo in June 1945, landing on Brunei. Following the end of the war, the battalion was disbanded in early 1946.

== History ==
=== Formation ===
Formed for service during the World War II, the 2/17th Battalion (Note: The numerical designation of 2nd AIF units was prefixed by "2/", which was used to set them apart from Militia units with corresponding numerical designations.) was raised on 26 April 1940 from Second Australian Imperial Force (2nd AIF) volunteers at Ingleburn, New South Wales. With an authorised strength of around 900 personnel, like other Australian infantry battalions of the time, the 2/17th was formed around a nucleus of four rifle companies – designated 'A' through to 'D' – each consisting of three platoons; these were supported by a battalion headquarters and a headquarters company with six specialist platoons: signals, pioneer, anti-aircraft, transport, administrative and mortars.

Upon formation, the battalion was placed under the command of Lieutenant Colonel John Crawford, who had previously served in the Militia and commanded the Sydney University Regiment and the 4th Battalion. The colours initially chosen for the battalion's unit colour patch (UCP) were the same as those of the 17th Battalion, a unit which had served during World War I before being raised as a Militia formation in 1921. These colours were black over green, in a diamond shape. A border of grey was added to the UCP to distinguish the battalion from its Militia counterpart. The shape was later changed, though, following the unit's involvement in the fighting at Tobruk, after which the 2/17th and other 9th Division units were authorised to adopt the T-shaped UCP signifying participation in the siege.

After completing individual training at Ingleburn, the battalion moved on foot to Bathurst to complete collective training. Following this, the 2/17th embarked for the Middle East from Sydney on 20 October 1940, on board the Queen Mary. Moving in convoy the Queen Mary briefly stopped in Fremantle, before continuing to Bombay in early November where the battalion was disembarked. Following a few days in camp ashore they were transferred to the Rohna for the next leg of the voyage. The convoy continued, sailing via the African coast into the Gulf of Aden and then through the Suez Canal, before finally berthing at El Kantara in Egypt. The battalion was assigned to the 20th Brigade, along with the 2/13th and 2/15th Battalions, which were initially allocated to the 7th Division; however, following its arrival in the Middle East in November 1940, the battalion was transferred along with the rest of the brigade to the 9th Division.

=== Middle East ===
Arriving in the Middle East in late November, the battalion undertook further training near Gaza in Palestine, before moving to Port Said in mid-December to relieve the garrison there. Returning to Palestine in early January they conducted a number of exercises until late February. In March 1941 the battalions of the 9th Division were sent into the desert to relieve the 6th Division that was deploying to Greece; as part of this the 2/17th garrisoned Mersa Brega, near Tripoli. Shortly after this, the Germans landed forces in Africa to reinforce the Italians and the British forces in Libya were forced to retreat from Benghazi to the strategically important port town of Tobruk. The 2/17th fell back as part of the general retreat and subsequently took part in the defence of Tobruk, remaining there for almost seven months during which time the battalion's personnel alternated between conducting patrols in no man's land, raiding, occupying the main defensive position and working in the rear areas. On the night of 13/14 April 1941, a party of about 30 Germans broke into the Australian position and set up eight machine-guns, a couple of mortars and two field guns. Seeing this, the nearest platoon commander, Lieutenant Austin Mackell, launched a counterattack with a small party of men consisting of one corporal and five soldiers. Covered by fire from a position on their flank, the small party was able to successfully attack the position, and as a result, Corporal John Edmondson, who single-handedly accounted for a number of Germans despite being mortally wounded, was later posthumously awarded the Victoria Cross, the nation's highest military decoration. It was the first such award to a member of the 2nd AIF. The battalion's losses during the fighting around Tobruk, including the withdrawal prior to the siege, consisted of 32 dead from all causes, 127 wounded and 14 captured.

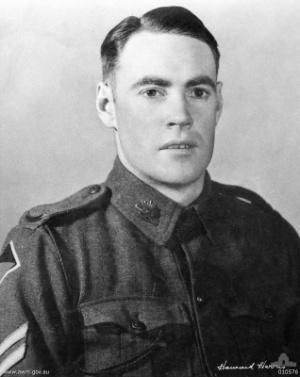
Corporal John Edmondson, c. 1941

Following their relief from Tobruk by units of the British 70th Division, the 2/17th Battalion was evacuated by the sea to Alexandria, and then moved to Palestine, arriving there in mid-October, establishing a camp at Julis. Shortly afterwards, a company was detached from the battalion to undertake guard duties in Broumane, in Syria, and in January 1942 the rest of the battalion followed. There, they were tasked with undertaking garrison duties as part of the occupation force that had been established there after the Syria–Lebanon campaign, to defend against a possible German attack on the Allied flank through the Caucasus. Relieving the 2/12th Battalion, the battalion established itself around Afrine, north of Aleppo; in March, after the 2nd New Zealand Division arrived, the battalion moved to Latakia.

Later, in July, as Axis forces launched an offensive in the Western Desert that threatened Egypt, during the First Battle of El Alamein the units of the 9th Division were moved back to North Africa to help stem the advance. The 2/17th Battalion subsequently carried out a blocking operation and then occupied a position around Tel el Eisa, from where it conducted patrols and observed German movements. In September, the 2/17th was relieved by the 2/15th Battalion, and went into reserve around Shammama to prepare for further operations. The battalion was subsequently tasked with active patrolling in the area, and clashed with German parties on a number of occasions, while its positions were also heavily shelled on a number of occasions which resulted in a few casualties. Meanwhile, several exercises and other training was undertaken prior to the upcoming offensive. During this time it had an effective strength of 30 officers and 731 other ranks.

In late October and early November 1942, the battalion took part in the Second Battle of El Alamein as the British Commonwealth forces went on the offensive. Engaged on the right of the Allied line around the coast, at dawn on 24 October, the Australians left their assembly area and advanced westward astride the coast road towards Tel el Eisa, and then cut inland towards the "Kidney Ridge", with the 2/17th on the right of the brigade during the initial advance, attacking with three companies forward. As the battle continued, they endured heavy counterattacks as the Germans sought to regain control of the strategically important coast road. Once these had been repelled, the focus of the fighting shifted away from the Australians as British forces were able to launch a break out, which subsequently forced the Germans to withdraw. The 9th Division was subsequently withdrawn to Gaza. During the battle, the 2/17th was heavily committed, losing 62 men killed in action or died of wounds, 203 wounded and four captured. (Note: Johnston provides two sets of figures for the battalion's casualties at El Alamein: two killed in action, one died of wounds, one died from accident, and 27 wounded for the period 7 July to 22 October 1942; and 40 killed in action, 20 died of wounds, 203 wounded in action and four captured for the period 23 October to 5 November 1942.)

=== Pacific ===
In early 1943, along with the rest of the 9th Division, the battalion was brought back to Australia in order to take part in fighting against the Japanese in the Pacific. This was the final stage in the withdrawal of the 2nd AIF divisions from the Middle East, as the Australian Army's focus had shifted to operations in the Pacific theatre against the Japanese. As part of this process the 6th and 7th Divisions had been brought back to Australia earlier the previous year. Embarking upon the transport Aquitania on 27 January 1943, the battalion sailed as part of a large convoy established as part of Operation Pamphlet; this convoy included the transports Ile de France, Nieuw Amsterdam, and the armed merchant cruiser Queen of Bermuda, and was escorted by HMS Devonshire and several destroyers. The voyage lasted a month, with the troops arriving in Sydney on 27 February.

Converted to the jungle divisional establishment on their return to Australia, the battalions of the 9th Division were reorganised to prepare them for the rigours of jungle warfare. This saw their establishment drop to around 800 men, and the loss of much of their vehicular and heavy equipment. Following training on the Atherton Tablelands in Queensland, the battalion was deployed to New Guinea where it took part in the Salamaua–Lae and Huon Peninsula campaigns in 1943–44. During this time, after concentrating at Milne Bay in August 1943, the 2/17th was involved in the first amphibious landing conducted by Australian soldiers since the landing at Anzac Cove of 25 April 1915, when it took part in the landing at Lae as part of Operation Postern on 4 September 1943. Lae fell more quickly than the Allied planners expected, and as a result, a quick follow-up operation was planned to secure the Huon Peninsula. On 22 September, the battalion landed at Scarlet Beach and, tasked with securing the beachhead and the flank, proceeded to move inland towards Sattelberg as part of efforts to capture Finschhafen. Finding their way blocked, the battalion later took part in significant actions around Jivevaneng and Kumawa, and then, after Sattelberg finally fell, the drive towards Sio. The battalion's casualties during this time amounted to 53 killed in action, 10 died of wounds, five died from accident, and 160 wounded in action.

In March 1944, the battalion returned to Australia for rest and re-organisation, sailing on the transport Clip Fontain. Although the Australian Army had been heavily committed to combat operations in the Pacific in the early years of the war against Japan, by 1944 the United States military had assumed primary responsibility for combat operations in the Pacific and this had resulted in uncertainty about the role of the Australian Army in future operations. As a result, a long period of training followed, and there was a significant turn over of personnel within the 9th Division as many men were discharged for medical reasons or transferred to other units and young replacements were brought in. After concentrating at Ravenshoe in May 1944, the battalion was rebuilt, focusing on individual training and then collective training up to battalion level. After this, in September 1944, the battalion moved to Trinity Beach, close to Cairns, where amphibious training was conducted. Further training continued throughout October and November 1944. At the end of the year, the tempo dropped off and the battalion's personnel were occupied with sporting activities prior to leave in February and March 1945. Finally, in early May 1945, the battalion moved to Townsville where it boarded the transport David C. Shanks, bound for Morotai Island.

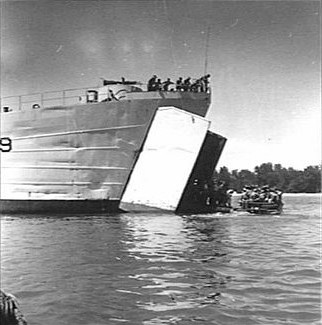
Troops from the 2/17th landing on Labuan in November 1945 after being withdrawn from Seria

On Morotai, the 2/17th concentrated along with the rest of the 9th Division, which had been allocated to take part in operations to recapture Borneo as part of Operation Oboe. The battalion's part in this plan saw them land on Brunei on 10 June 1945 as part of Operation Oboe Six. Coming ashore near Brooketon, the battalion took part in capturing the capital before dispatching companies to secure individual objectives in the outlying areas as the Australians advanced along the coast towards the oilfields at Seria. In mid-July, 'D' Company carried out a patrol along the Baram River on board HMAS Tiger Snake. On 13 August, following the atomic bombings of Hiroshima and Nagasaki, the order to cease offensive action was received from 20th Brigade headquarters and two days later the war came to an end with Japan's capitulation. Despite this, it was not until 10 September that the Japanese on Borneo formally surrendered, and the bulk of the battalion remained deployed until the end of the month. During this time they were involved in ensuring all Japanese forces in the area received the surrender instructions and complied with them, and with collecting and escorting surrendered Japanese soldiers and former Indian prisoners of war, with the battalion's last operation being completed in early October. The battalion's final campaign cost 24 men killed or wounded. (Note: Johnston provides the following figures: seven killed in action, two died of wounds, one died from accident, and 15 wounded in action.)

=== Disbandment ===
Following the end of hostilities the demobilisation process began, and personnel began to be repatriated to Australia to return to civilian life or were transferred to units of the 34th Brigade for further service during the occupation of Japan. On 29 October, the battalion was declared "redundant" and was transferred to Labuan having been withdrawn from the Seria area; personnel were subsequently occupied with various sporting competitions and education programs intended to help them transition into civilian life upon their return to Australia. This return was eagerly awaited, but the Australian troops remained for several months until British and Indian troops arrived to relieve the 9th Division of its occupation duties. In mid-December what remained of the 2/17th embarked upon the Pachaug Victory for the return to Australia. Arriving in Brisbane, from there the battalion's personnel moved to Sydney and went on Christmas leave. On 8 February 1946, while at Ingleburn, the 2/17th Battalion was disbanded.

During the course of the war, a total of 2,903 personnel served in the battalion, of whom 177 were killed in action or died of wounds, three died on active service, 542 were wounded in action and 18 were taken prisoner. (Note: The Australian War Memorial provides slightly different figures: 188 men were killed in action or died on active service, and 573 wounded.) Members of the 2/17th received the following decorations: one Victoria Cross, four Distinguished Service Orders and one bar, one British Empire Medal, 11 Military Crosses, three Distinguished Conduct Medals, 11 Military Medals and 46 Mentions in Despatches. In addition, three members of the battalion were appointed Officers of the Order of the British Empire, and one was appointed as a Member of the Order of the British Empire. In 1997, a memorial to the 2/17th Battalion was built at Jivevaneng.

== Battle honours ==
For their service during World War II, the 2/17th Battalion received the following battle honours:

- North Africa 1941–42, Defence of Tobruk, El Adem Road, El Alamein, Alam el Halfa, South-West Pacific 1943–45, Lae–Nadzab, Finschhafen, Scarlet Beach, Defence of Scarlet Beach, Jivenaneng–Kumawa, (Note: The correct spelling is "Jivevaneng"; however, when the battle honour was awarded in 1961 by the Australian Army it appears to have been misspelt as "Jivenaneng".) Liberation of Australian New Guinea, Sio, Borneo, Brunei.

In 1961, these battle honours were entrusted to the 17th/18th Battalion (North Shore Regiment), which had been formed in 1948, when Australia's part-time military force was re-raised under the guise of the Citizens Military Force. Through a series of re-organisations, these battle honours were passed to the 2nd/17th Battalion, Royal New South Wales Regiment, an Australian Army Reserve infantry battalion that is currently based in central New South Wales.

== Commanding officers ==
The following officers served as commanding officer of the 2/17th Battalion:

- Lieutenant Colonel John Crawford (26 April 1940 – 14 January 1942);
- Lieutenant Colonel Maurice Fergusson (15 January 1942 – 6 March 1942);
- Lieutenant Colonel Noel Simpson (7 March 1942 – 27 February 1944); and
- Lieutenant Colonel John Broadbent (28 February 1944 – 8 February 1946).

== Notes ==
Footnotes

Citations
