= Siki Cove =

Siki Cove is a cove, south of the Song River, north of Arndt Point and east of the village of Katika in Morobe Province, Papua New Guinea. Siki Creek flows into the cove.

== History ==
Siki Cove was a landing site during the Allied campaign to capture Finschhafen in September 1943. In the early hours of 22 September, some Allied landing craft carrying troops from the Australian Army's 20th Brigade mistakenly landed at Siki Cove instead of their intended destination at Scarlet Beach. Japanese forces defended both landing areas using pillboxes and shallow trenches, and the landing parties came under heavy attack.
