= USS LST-18 =

1943 LST-1-class tank landing ship

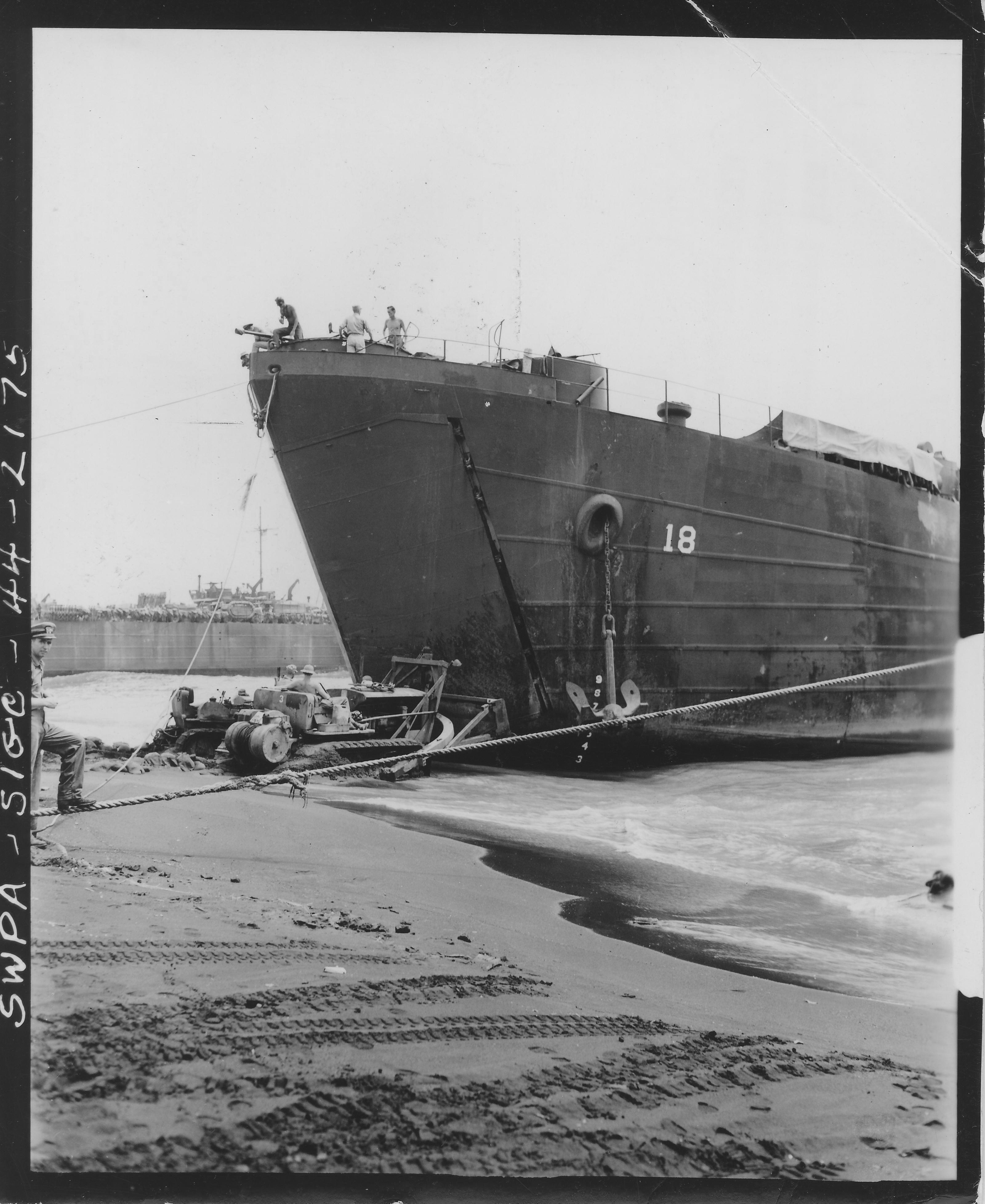
- USS LST-18, ready to retract from a beach with the help of several bulldozers, date and location unknown.

History

United States
- Name: LST-18
- Builder: Dravo Corporation, Pittsburgh, Pennsylvania
- Laid down: 1 October 1942
- Launched: 15 February 1943
- Sponsored by: Miss Ruth Watt
- Commissioned: 19 April 1943, reduced commission; 26 April 1943, full commission
- Decommissioned: 3 April 1946
- Stricken: 17 April 1946
- Identification: Hull symbol: LST-18; Code letters: NPJF
- Honors and awards: 7 × battle stars
- Fate: Sold for conversion to commercial service, 31 October 1946, scrapped 31 July 1959

General characteristics
- Type: LST-1-class tank landing ship
- Displacement: 4,080 long tons (4,145 t) full load; 2,160 long tons (2,190 t) landing
- Length: 328 ft (100 m) oa
- Beam: 50 ft (15 m)
- Draft: Full load: 8 ft 2 in (2.49 m) forward; 14 ft 1 in (4.29 m) aft; Landing at 2,160 t: 3 ft 11 in (1.19 m) forward; 9 ft 10 in (3.00 m) aft
- Installed power: 2 × 900 hp (670 kW) Electro-Motive Diesel 12-567A diesel engines; 1,700 shp (1,300 kW)
- Propulsion: 1 × Falk main reduction gears; 2 × Propellers
- Speed: 12 kn (22 km/h; 14 mph)
- Range: 24,000 nmi (44,000 km; 28,000 mi) at 9 kn (17 km/h; 10 mph) while displacing 3,960 long tons (4,024 t)
- Boats & landing craft carried: 2 or 6 x LCVPs
- Capacity: 2,100 tons oceangoing maximum; 350 tons main deckload
- Troops: 16 officers, 147 enlisted men
- Complement: 13 officers, 104 enlisted men
- Armament: Varied, ultimate armament; 2 × twin 40 mm (1.57 in) Bofors guns; 4 × single 40 mm Bofors guns; 12 × 20 mm (0.79 in) Oerlikon cannons

Service record
- Part of: LST Flotilla 7
- Operations: Eastern New Guinea operations; Finschhafen occupation (22–24 June 1943); Bismarck Archipelago operations; Cape Gloucester landings, New Britain (25–30 December 1943, 5–9, 15–19, and 23–27 January 1944); Admiralty Islands landings (28 March–1 April 1944); Hollandia operation (21–26 April and 1–7 May 1944); Western New Guinea operations; Toem-Wakde-Sarmi area operation (17–19 and 21–23 May 1944); Biak Island operation (8–10 and 12–16 June 1944); Noemfoor Island operation (2–7 and 9–14 July 1944); Cape Sansapor operation (30 July and 2 August 1944); Morotai landing (15 September 1944); Leyte landings (13 October–29 November 1944); Luzon operation; Lingayen Gulf landings (4–18 January 1945); Palawan Island landings (1–2 March 1945); Visayan Islands landings (29 March–1 April 1945)
- Awards: American Campaign Medal; Asiatic–Pacific Campaign Medal; World War II Victory Medal; Navy Occupation Service Medal w/Asia Clasp; Philippine Republic Presidential Unit Citation; Philippine Liberation Medal

USS LST-18 was a United States Navy LST-1-class tank landing ship used exclusively in the Asiatic-Pacific Theater during World War II and crewed by the United States Coast Guard. Like many of her class, she was not named and is properly referred to by her hull designation.

== Construction ==
LST-18 was laid down on 1 October 1942, at Pittsburgh, Pennsylvania by the Dravo Corporation; launched on 15 February 1943; sponsored by Miss Ruth Watt; placed in reduced commission for transportation to be fitted out; and fully commissioned on 26 April 1943.

== Service history ==
During the war LST-18 served exclusively and extensively in the Asiatic-Pacific Theater from September 1943 until November 1945.

LST-18 was then floated down the Ohio and Mississippi rivers from 19 to 25 April 1943, arriving at New Orleans on the latter date. When she entered commissioned service there were only 7 officers and 67 enlisted men in the original crew. After tests and maneuvers at St. Andrews, Florida, she returned to New Orleans on 14 May 1943, for post-shakedown availability. She was then assigned to LST Flotilla 7, Group 21, Division 41.

LST-18 left Galveston, Texas, on 25 May 1943, with Convoy HK 186 headed for Key West, Florida, where she arrived on 29 May 1943.

On 1 June 1943, she got underway for the Canal Zone. Arriving at Coca Sola, Canal Zone, on 14 June 1943, Commander Clarence H. Peterson, USCG, with two officers and 13 enlisted men reported aboard for duty to the staff of Group 21, LST Flotilla 7 and LST-18 was designated flagship for the group.

She then travelled to Australia, where she left Caloundra, Queensland, on 23 August 1943, en route to Townsville, Queensland, with Convoy QL 8, arriving on 26 August. From there she left two days later with Convoy TN 147 en route to Milne Bay, Territory of Papua, where she arrived on 31 August 1943.

She then proceeded to Milne Bay, New Guinea, arriving on 2 September 1943, for ten days of beaching operations and loading for the first trip in the forward areas.

=== Eastern New Guinea operation ===
LST-18 participated in the landing at Scarlet Beach, New Guinee during the Battle of Finschhafen from 22 to 24 September 1943.

=== Bismarck Archipelago operation ===
LST-18 participated in the Cape Gloucester landings, New Britain at the end of December 1943 and January 1944. She then assisted in the Admiralty Islands landings at the end of March until 1 April 1944.

=== Hollandia and Western New Guinea operation ===
LST-18 remained busy participating in the Hollandia operation at the end of April and the beginning of May 1944, the Toem-Wakde-Sarmi area in the middle of May 1944, the Biak Island invasion in the middle of June 1944, the Noemfoor Island invasion at the beginning to the middle of July 1944, the Cape Sansapor landings at the end of July and the beginning of August 1944, and the Morotai landings in mid-September 1944.

=== Leyte operation ===
From the Western New Guinea area LST-18 moved to the Philippines to participate in General Douglas MacArthur's promised liberation of the islands from the Japanese occupation starting with the Leyte landings from the middle of October until the end of November 1944.

LST-18 ended her combat career participating in the Battle of Luzon Lingayen Gulf landings from the beginning to the middle of January 1945, the Palawan Island landings at the beginning of March 1945, and then the Visayan Islands landings at the end of March and the beginning of April 1945.

In carrying out these invasions, LST-18 was under attack on eight different occasions by enemy planes, shore installations and torpedo. No casualties were suffered by the ship's crew, but one Army passenger was killed aboard, the result of an enemy aircraft strafing run. The ship carried approximately 19,000 st (270,000 lb; 120,000 kg) of equipment in all these trips and about 16,000 Army and Navy personnel. She also evacuated 617 ambulatory cases and 179 stretcher cases from the various beachheads. There were three deaths aboard; one Army enlisted who had been brought on board for treatment; one Army passenger who died of wounds during an air attack (mentioned earlier) and one prisoner of war who was brought on board for treatment. Up to the time of the ship's return to San Francisco on 16 December 1945, 291 enlisted men and 33 officers had served aboard at various intervals.

== Postwar career ==
After the cessation of hostilities on 14 August 1945, the LST made one support landing at Brunei Bay, Borneo, on 25 August 1945, and then completed her tour of duty by taking a load of occupation troops to Taku, China.

LST-18 performed occupation duty in the Far East until early November 1945. She returned to the United States and was decommissioned on 3 April 1946. She was struck from the Navy list on 17 April 1946 and was sold to the Suwannee Fruit & Steamship Co., of Jacksonville, Florida, on 31 October 1946 for conversion to merchant service, before eventually being scrapped on 31 July 1959.

== Awards ==
- American Campaign Medal
- Asiatic-Pacific Campaign Medal with seven battle stars
- World War II Victory Medal
- Navy Occupation Medal with "ASIA" clasp
- China Service Medal
- Philippine Presidential Unit Citation
- Philippine Liberation Medal

== Bibliography ==
- "LST-18". Dictionary of American Naval Fighting Ships. Naval History and Heritage Command. 4 August 2015. This article incorporates text from this source, which is in the public domain.
- "USS LST-18". NavSource. 28 April 2017.
- "Convoy HK.186". Arnold Hague Convoy Database.
- "Convoy QL.8". Arnold Hague Convoy Database.
- "Convoy TN.147". Arnold Hague Convoy Database.
- "USS LST-18" (PDF). United States Coast Guard. This article incorporates text from this source, which is in the public domain.
