= John Wilson Crawford =

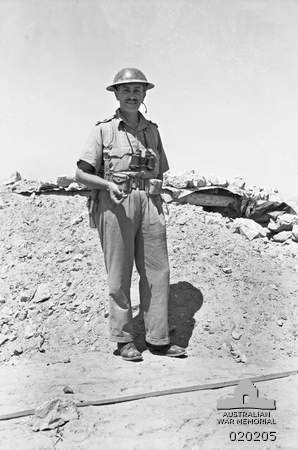
- Crawford, then a lieutenant colonel, at Tobruk, September 1941
- Born: 8 July 1899; Paddington, New South Wales, Australia
- Died: 7 March 1943 (aged 43); Freshwater Gorge, near Cairns, Australia
- Burial place: Cairns war cemetery, Cairns
- Military career
- Allegiance: Australia
- Branch: Australian Army
- Service years: 1922–1943
- Rank: Brigadier
- Nickname: "Cake Eater"
- Service number: NX378
- Commands: York Force (1942–43); 11th Brigade (1942–43); 2/17th Battalion (1940–42); 4th Battalion (1939–40); Sydney University Regiment (1933–37)
- Conflicts: Second World War; Siege of Tobruk; Home Front
- Awards: Distinguished Service Order; Mentioned in Despatches (2); Efficiency Decoration

Brigadier John Wilson Crawford, DSO, ED (8 July 1899 – 7 March 1943) served in the Australian Army during the Second World War. Prior to the war, he was a solicitor and an officer in the Citizen Military Forces. Called up to the army following the outbreak of hostilities in 1939, he commanded the 2/17th Battalion during the Siege of Tobruk. From April 1942, he commanded the 11th Brigade and York Force. He was killed in an aircraft crash near Cairns on 7 March 1943.

== Early life ==
Crawford was born on 8 July 1899 in Paddington, a suburb of Sydney, to Irish immigrants. He had an interest in the military from an early age, joining his school's cadet unit and later, the Sydney University Scouts. After completing his university education, he qualified as a solicitor. During the Great Depression, he was associated with the Old Guard, a paramilitary group organized in order to prevent a hypothesized socialist revolution. Crawford was group clerk for quota 1 headquarters of the Old Guard's Pacific Highway nucleus. He was also active in the Citizen Military Forces, and by 1933 was in command of the Sydney University Regiment with the rank of lieutenant colonel.

== Second World War ==
When the Second World War began, Crawford was called up for full-time duty with the Australian Army. After a brief period in command of the 4th Battalion, he volunteered for the Second Australian Imperial Force (AIF) in March 1940. In due course, he was tasked with the establishment of the 2/17th Battalion. The battalion was duly formed at Liverpool, and was intended to be attached to the 20th Brigade, 7th Division for service in the Middle East. The battalion was formed mainly from New South Welshmen and would spend the next six months in training. Crawford was a firm believer in discipline; his nickname of "Cake Eater" was derived from his strict adherence to formal protocols for official social functions.

=== North Africa ===
Crawford's battalion arrived in the Middle East in November 1940 and was initially based in Palestine. However, in February 1941, it was decided to reorganise the AIF forces present in the Middle East, and this resulted in the battalion's parent formation, the 20th Brigade, being transferred to the newly formed 9th Division. This new formation replaced the 6th Division in the area around Tripoli, with the 2/17th Battalion situated at near Mersa Berga by early March. The Italian forces in Libya's Cyrenaica region had largely been destroyed during Operation Compass. However, the Germans were gradually building up their forces in the area and, on 24 March, Erwin Rommel's Afrika Korps attacked the Allied lines. This eventually forced the withdrawal of 9th Division to Tobruk, a critical port city.

The 2/17th Battalion was placed on the southern portion of the defensive perimeter on 10 April. The following day, it beat off an initial attack by German infantry and armour. Probing attacks followed, and Crawford recognised these as preparatory skirmishing for a heavier attack in the following days. Reorganising his battalion's defences, he was able to respond appropriately when the expected attack commenced on the evening of 13 April. Despite tanks penetrating the battalion's lines, Crawford's control of subsequent counterattacks (supported by artillery and the neighbouring 2/15th Battalion) saw the attack rebuffed. The battalion remained on the outskirts of Tobruk, manning its defensive positions and carrying out patrols until the night of 21 October, at which stage it was relieved.

During his time at Tobruk, Crawford was recommended for the Distinguished Service Order (DSO) and was twice mentioned in despatches for his leadership during the period March to July 1941. The battalion, together with the rest of the division, spent the next several months in Palestine and Syria. In January 1942, Crawford handed over command of his battalion to Maurice Fergusson when he was assigned to the position of liaison officer, I Corps headquarters.

=== Home Front ===
In April 1942, Crawford was promoted to temporary brigadier and placed in command of the 11th Brigade, a militia formation, in Queensland. He was also commander of York Force, a militia unit defending the Cape York Peninsula.

On 7 March 1943, Crawford was a passenger on a Royal Australian Air Force plane, which, following take off, went missing. Reported overdue that evening, it took searchers five days to locate the crash site, which was in remote and difficult terrain. Crawford was one of three men killed in the crash and was buried with full military honours. He was survived by his wife, Gladys Marjory Lyndon Clay, whom he had married in 1928, and his daughter. His DSO insignia was presented to his wife in June 1944.
