= York Force =

York Force was a detachment of the Australian Army during the Second World War located on the Cape York Peninsula. It was a Militia formation raised to provide for the defence of Cape York Peninsula; a similar unit, the Torres Strait Force, operated in the Torres Strait region. From mind-1943 York Force included the 1st Independent Light Horse Squadron, raised from the 2nd Australian Cavalry Regiment which had itself been created from the militia's 2nd/14th Light Horse Regiment.

York Force was disbanded at one minute past midnight on 8 September 1943. The senior command unit in the region then became 3rd Brigade. The York Force Field Punishment Centre at Oonoonba operated under that name until it was disbanded in January 1944.

== Commander ==
- Brigadier John Wilson Crawford
