= John Edmondson (soldier) =

Australian Victoria Cross recipient (1914–1941)

John Edmondson VC
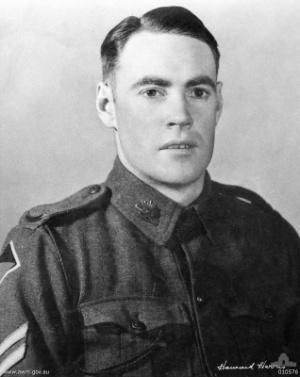
- Jack Edmondson c. 1941
- Born: 8 October 1914; Wagga Wagga, Australia
- Died: 14 April 1941 (aged 26); Tobruk, Italian Libya
- Burial place: Tobruk War Cemetery
- Military career
- Allegiance: Australia
- Branch: Second Australian Imperial Force
- Service years: 1939–1941
- Rank: Corporal
- Units: 2/17th Infantry Battalion
- Conflicts: Second World War; North African Campaign; Western Desert Campaign; Siege of Tobruk (DOW)
- Awards: Victoria Cross

John Hurst Edmondson, VC (8 October 1914 – 14 April 1941) was an Australian recipient of the Victoria Cross, the highest award for gallantry in the face of the enemy that can be awarded to British and Commonwealth forces.

== Early life ==
John Hurst Edmondson was born in Wagga Wagga, New South Wales. His parents, Joseph William (Will) Edmondson and Maude Elizabeth Edmondson (née Hurst), moved to the Sydney suburb of Liverpool where he attended Austral Public School and Hurlstone Agricultural High School. He later became a farm worker.

== Second World War ==
On 20 May 1940 Edmondson enlisted in the 2/17th Battalion after serving with the 4th Militia Battalion since March 1939. He was promoted to corporal. After training at Ingleburn and Bathurst, his battalion embarked for the Middle East on 19 October 1940 as reinforcements for the 9th Division. After desert training, his division relieved the 6th Australian Division at Marsa Brega in Cyrenaica on 9 March 1941. On 31 March, the German forces under the command of General Erwin Rommel mounted an attack on the Australian and British positions, forcing them to retreat. The 9th Division took up new positions outside the port of Tobruk and on 11 April, the now famous siege began.

=== Victoria Cross citation ===
The announcement and accompanying citation for the decoration was published in supplement to the London Gazette on 1 July 1941, reading:

'War Office, 1st July, 1941.

The KING has been graciously pleased to approve the posthumous award of the VICTORIA CROSS to:—

No. 15705 Corporal John Hurst Edmondson, Australian Military Forces.

On the night of 13th–14th April, 1941, a party of German infantry broke through the wire defences at Tobruk, and established themselves with at least six machine guns, mortars and two small field pieces. It was decided to attack them with bayonets, and a party consisting of one officer, Corporal Edmondson and five privates, took part in the charge. During the counter-attack Corporal Edmondson was wounded in the neck and stomach but continued to advance under heavy fire and killed one enemy with his bayonet. Later, his officer had his bayonet in one of the enemy and was grasped about the legs by him, when another attacked him from behind. He called for help, and Corporal Edmondson, who was some yards away, immediately came to his assistance and in spite of his wounds, killed both of the enemy. This action undoubtedly saved his officer's life.

Shortly after returning from this successful counter-attack, Corporal Edmondson died of his wounds. His actions throughout the operations were outstanding for resolution, leadership and conspicuous bravery.

An hour later, 200 German infantrymen attacked the post, forcing the Australians to withdraw, and established a bridgehead in the outer defensive line. However, the fierceness of the platoon's defence pressured Rommel into diverting troops from his main attack. The attack failed, with the German tanks being mauled and forced to retreat with heavy casualties.

Corporal John Edmondson died of his wounds and is buried in the Tobruk war cemetery. He was the first Australian to receive the Victoria Cross in the war. Edmondson's VC was presented to his mother by the Governor-General on 27 September 1941. In 1969, she presented her son's medals and some of his personal belongings to the Australian War Memorial, where they still are on display.

== Legacy ==
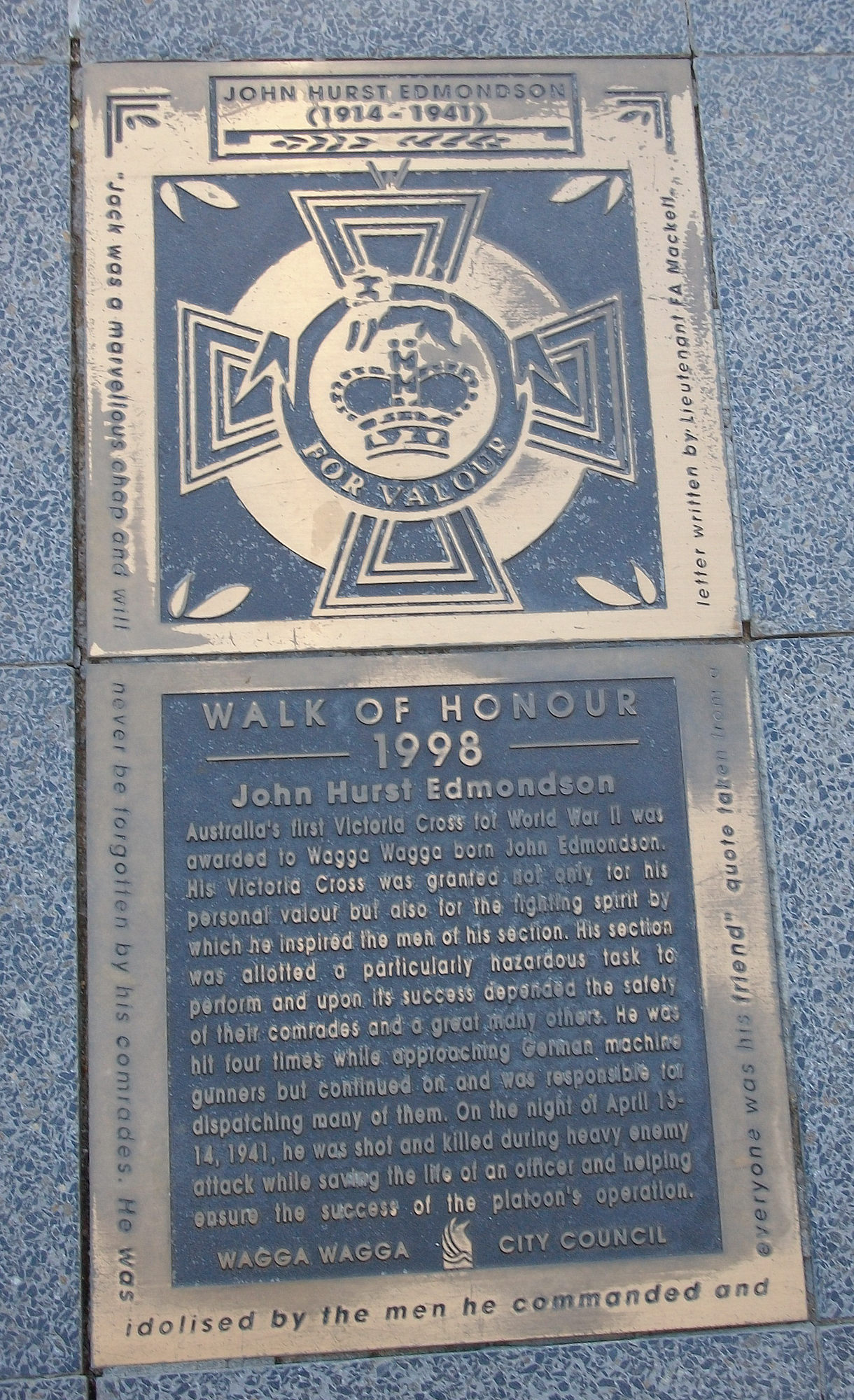
John Hurst Edmondson plaque

His name is still honoured by: the John Edmondson VC Rest Area at Roses Lagoon on the Remembrance Driveway from Sydney to Canberra; John Edmondson VC Memorial RSL Club, Liverpool, NSW; a plaque in the Walk of Honour in Baylis Street, in his birthplace of Wagga Wagga, NSW; the school hall in his former school, Hurlstone Agricultural High School, is named after him; a high school in the Horningsea Park district in NSW is named after him; the Sydney suburb of Edmondson Park, and Edmondson Street in the Sydney suburb of North Ryde, are named in his honour. Edmondson St in Campbell situated in Canberra, within 400m of the War Memorial is also named in his honour. Freemasons' Lodge Victoria Cross No. 928 of the United Grand Lodge of New South Wales and Australian Capital Territory (UGLNSWACT) which meets in Fairfield, NSW, was formed in honour of Cpl J H Edmondson, who was posted to Holsworthy Army Barracks, and who was an attending member of Liverpool Lodge. The Edmondson VC Club at ARTC Kapooka, an outer suburb of Wagga Wagga, is also named in his honour.
