= Kamaua, Papua New Guinea =

New Guinean village

Kamaua Kumaua, Kumawa
- Interactive map of Kamaua
- Coordinates: 6°32′35″S 147°46′48″E
- Country: Papua New Guinea
- Province: Morobe
- District: Finschhafen District
- Elevation: 296 m (971 ft)
- Time zone: UTC+10

Kamaua (Kumawa, Kumaua) is a village in Morobe Province, Papua New Guinea. It was a site of conflict during World War II.

== Conflict ==
On October 5, 1943, the 2/17th Battalion (minus two companies) captured the village from the Japanese Empire. Later the 2/15th Battalion arrived on October 8 and 9, 1943. With the 2/17th Battalion leaving shortly after. Because of the conflict starting on October 9, 2/15th Battalion cleared the entire Kumawa area and held the position until they were replaced by the 2/23rd Battalion on November 3, 1943.

== Climate ==
The climate of Kamaua is most often very warm, with temperatures ranging from 78°F to 85°F on average during the day. Similar to a tropical rainforest, it gets an average of approximately 73 inches of rain a year.
