= Bumi River =

River in Papua New Guinea

Coordinates: 6°33′S 147°51′E

Location
- Country: Papua New Guinea
- Region: Morobe Province

Physical characteristics
- Source
  - location: Papua New Guinea

The Bumi River is located just north of Finschhafen in Morobe Province of Papua New Guinea.

It saw fighting in September 1943 during the New Guinea campaign of the Second World War.
