= John Raymond Broadbent (major general) =

Australian general

- Born: 24 June 1914; Manly, New South Wales
- Died: 27 October 2006 (aged 92); North Sydney, New South Wales
- Military career
- Allegiance: Australia
- Branch: Australian Army
- Service years: 1935–1966
- Rank: Major General
- Service number: NX12225; 261506
- Commands: 2nd Division (1965–66); 5th Brigade (1955–58); 17th/18th Battalion (1948–51); 2/17th Battalion (1944–46)
- Conflicts: Second World War; North African Campaign; Siege of Tobruk; South West Pacific theatre; Salamaua–Lae campaign
- Awards: Commander of the Order of the British Empire; Distinguished Service Order; Efficiency Decoration; Mentioned in Despatches

Major General John Raymond Broadbent, CBE, DSO, ED (24 June 1914 – 27 October 2006) was an Australian Army officer and lawyer.

== Early life and career ==
Broadbent studied at the University of Sydney, gaining the degrees of Bachelor of Laws and Bachelor of Arts in 1938.

== Military career ==
Broadbent joined the Sydney University Regiment in 1935 and was commissioned in 1937. He served in the 17th Battalion (The North Sydney Regiment) during the interwar period, enlisted in Second Australian Imperial Force on 7 May 1940, and arrived in the Middle East in November. He was appointed captain in 1941. Broadbent returned to Sydney in February 1943 and was posted to New Guinea from August 1943 to February 1944. He was promoted temporary lieutenant colonel in February 1944 and awarded the Distinguished Service Order in April for "energy and determined leadership at Lae and Finschhafen" as a major. Broadbent was posted to Borneo from April to December 1945 and discharged on 15 March 1946 with the rank of lieutenant colonel while Commanding Officer of the 2/17th Battalion.

Broadbent was appointed the first commanding officer of the 17/18th Battalion (The North Shore Regiment) on the raising of the Citizen Military Forces (CMF) in 1948. He was placed on the Reserve of Officers in 1951 and was appointed commander 5th Brigade as a brigadier in 1955. In 1958 he joined Eastern Command Officers Staff Group (ACMF) and was promoted to major general in 1963 to command Headquarters Communications Zone. From August 1965 to November 1966 Broadbent was General Officer Commanding the 2nd Division; and from December 1966 was appointed to the Unattached List of Eastern Command. On 10 June 1967, Broadbent was appointed a Commander of the Order of the British Empire in the Queen's Birthday Honours List.
