= Nongora =

Village in Papua New Guinea

Nongora is a village on the Huon Peninsula, in Morobe Province, Papua New Guinea. The village was liberated by the Australian Army during World War II in December 1943.
