= Kotte Rural LLG =

Local-level government in Papua New Guinea

- Location within Papua New Guinea
- Coordinates: 6.43°S 147.75°E
- Country: Papua New Guinea
- Province: Morobe Province
- Time zone: UTC+10 (AEST)
- Website: www.finance.gov.pg/about-us-2/provincial-and-district-finance-office/momase-region/morobe/

Kotte Rural LLG is a local-level government (LLG) of Morobe Province, Papua New Guinea.

== Wards ==
- 01. Keregia
- 02. Merikeo
- 03. Bolingboneng
- 04. Yunzaing
- 05. Wareo
- 06. Fior
- 07. Maruruo
- 08. Jivewaneng
- 09. Siki
- 10. Heldsbach
