= Katika, Papua New Guinea =

Coordinates: 6°28′S 147°50′E

Katika is a village on the Huon Peninsula, in Siki ward of Kotte Rural LLG, Morobe Province, Papua New Guinea.
