= Wareo =

Village in Morobe Province, Papua New Guinea

Coordinates: 6°27′S 147°47′E

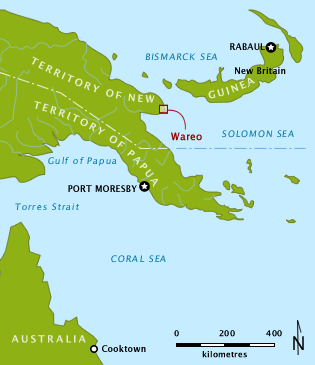
Location of Wareo in Papua New Guinea

Wareo is a village on the Huon Peninsula, in Kotte Rural LLG, Morobe Province, Papua New Guinea. The village was liberated by the Australian Army during World War II in December 1943.
