= Jivevaneng =

Coordinates: 6°30′S 147°47′E

Jivevaneng (also spelled Jivewaneng or Zivewaneng) is a town located on the Huon Peninsula, in Kotte Rural LLG, Morobe Province, Papua New Guinea.
