= 2/48th Battalion (Australia) =

Infantry battalion of the Australian Army

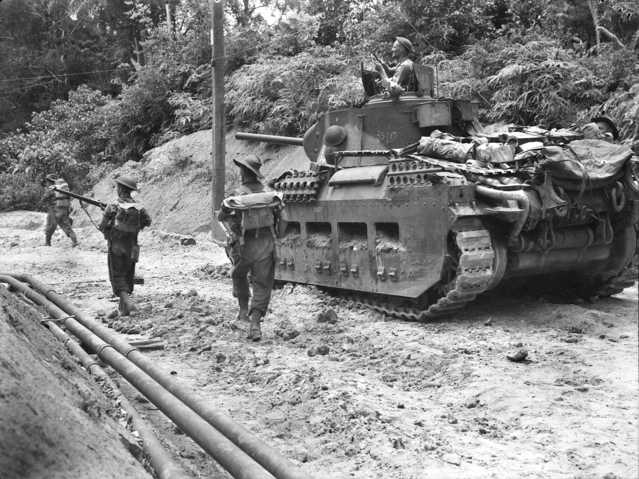
- Troops from 'C' Company, 2/48th Battalion advance alongside Matilda tanks from the 2/9th Armoured Regiment during the attack on the "Sykes" feature on Tarakan in April 1945
- Active: 1940–1945
- Country: Australia
- Branch: Australian Army
- Type: Infantry
- Size: ~800–900 all ranks (Note: The establishment of a standard infantry battalion was 35 officers and 875 other ranks. Under the jungle organisation each battalion was reduced by one officer and 106 other ranks.)
- Part of: 26th Brigade, 9th Division
- Colours: White and light blue
- Engagements: Second World War: North African Campaign; Siege of Tobruk; First Battle of El Alamein; Second Battle of El Alamein; New Guinea campaign; Salamaua–Lae campaign; Huon Peninsula campaign; Borneo campaign; Battle of Tarakan

Commanders
- Notable commanders: Victor Windeyer; Heathcote Hammer

Insignia
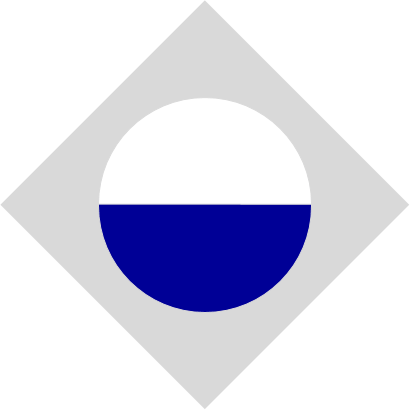
- Unit colour patch (1940–42)

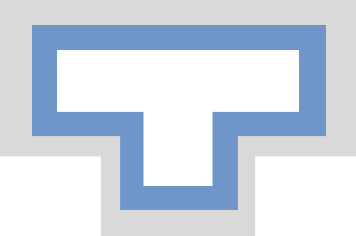
- (1942–45)

The 2/48th Battalion was an infantry battalion of the Australian Army which served during the Second World War. Raised in Adelaide in South Australia in August 1940, the battalion formed part of the 26th Brigade and was initially assigned to the 7th Division, although it was later transferred to the 9th Division in 1941 when it was deployed to the Middle East. While there, it saw action during the siege of Tobruk and the First and Second Battles of El Alamein before being returned to Australia to take part in the fighting in New Guinea following Japan's entry into the war.

During the campaign in New Guinea, the battalion took part in the advance on Lae during the Salamaua–Lae campaign and the fighting around Finschhafen and Sattelberg, during the Huon Peninsula campaign. Following this it was withdrawn to Australia, where it remained for over a year. In mid-1945, the 2/48th Battalion took part in the landing on Tarakan, which was its final involvement in the war. It was disbanded in October 1945 and is considered to be Australia's most highly decorated unit of the war, with four members receiving the Victoria Cross, the nation's highest decoration for gallantry, while over 90 other decorations were also made to its members.

== History ==
=== Formation ===
The 2/48th Battalion (Note: The numerical designation of 2nd AIF units was prefixed by "2/", which was used to set them apart from Militia units with corresponding numerical designations.) was raised on 9 August 1940 at the Wayville Showgrounds, in Adelaide, under the command of Lieutenant Colonel Victor Windeyer, a former Militia officer who had previously commanded the Sydney University Regiment. A unit of the all-volunteer Second Australian Imperial Force (2nd AIF), the 2/48th Battalion was formed specifically for service overseas and recruited mainly from the state of South Australia. The battalion's headquarters staff began arriving early in the month, with many of the key personnel having served previously in South Australian Militia units, including the 27th Battalion (South Australian Scottish Regiment). At the end of August, a large draft of recruits arrived from the 2nd Infantry Training Depot, and rudimentary individual training was undertaken in the nearby park lands. The colours initially chosen for the battalion's unit colour patch (UCP) were the same as those of the 48th Battalion, a unit which had served during the First World War before being raised as a Militia formation in 1921. These colours were white over dark blue, in a circle shape, although a diamond-shaped border of gray was added to the UCP to distinguish the battalion from its Militia counterpart; this was later changed, though, following the unit's involvement in the fighting at Tobruk, when it adopted a T-shaped UCP.

With an authorised strength of around 900 personnel, like other Australian infantry battalions of the time, the battalion was formed around a nucleus of four rifle companies—designated 'A' through to 'D'—each consisting of three platoons. These companies were supported by a battalion headquarters and a headquarters company with six specialist platoons: signals, pioneer, anti-aircraft, transport, administrative and mortars. Forming part of the 26th Brigade along with the 2/23rd and 2/24th Battalions, it was assigned to the 7th Division during its initial training period but was later transferred with the rest of the 26th Brigade to the 9th Division. After pre-embarkation leave, the battalion undertook three weeks of collective training at Woodside, in October. The following month, the battalion marched through the city of Adelaide prior to its deployment overseas, and shortly afterwards embarked for North Africa. Entraining at Oakbank, after undertaking a 4.5-mile (7.2 km) route march in full equipment, the battalion embarked upon the troopship Stratheden on 17 November 1940; the large transport set sail the following day.

=== Actions in North Africa ===
Sailing via Colombo where the troops were given a brief shore leave, the Stratheden entered the Suez Canal in mid-December 1940. Upon arrival in the Middle East, the battalion briefly occupied a camp at El Kantara, before moving to Dimra, in Palestine. At Dimra, the battalion joined the rest of the 26th Brigade for the first time, and undertook further training until March 1941. At this time, it moved to Cyrenica, along with the rest of the 9th Division, to undertake further training in the desert and to relieve the 6th Division which was deploying to Greece. Shortly after this, the Germans landed forces in Africa to reinforce the Italians and as the Axis went on the offensive, the British and Commonwealth forces in Libya were forced to retreat from Benghazi to the strategically important port town of Tobruk. In early April, the 2/48th fell back as part of the general retreat, setting up a blocking position around Tmimi during the withdrawal to prevent a German force cutting the division's route along the coast road. After eight days of constant movement through the desert, the battalion reached the port. They subsequently took part in the defence of Tobruk, where the battalion saw its first action of the North African Campaign for which it would receive one of its many battle honours.

The 2/48th first entered Tobruk's defences on 9 April 1941 with the rest of the 9th Division commanded by Lieutenant General Leslie Morshead. Instructed to hold the fortress for eight weeks by General Archibald Wavell, Commander-in-Chief of British Middle East Command, the 9th Division ended up defending the fortress for over eight months before being gradually withdrawn. The defensive system at Tobruk consisted of several lines: the outer position consisted of scattered perimeter posts and reserve company positions and was dubbed the "Red Line", while the secondary defence system, which was about 2 miles (3.2 km) behind the "Red Line", was dubbed the "Blue Line". During this time the battalion alternated between occupying part of the main defence line, working in the rear areas, and conducting patrols. In mid-April, while the battalion was stationed in the western sector, these patrols resulted in the battalion capturing virtually the entire 1st Battalion of the Italian 62nd Regiment, Trento Division, totalling nearly 800 officers and men. Later that month, the 2/48th took part in a daylight raid on a hill opposite their perimeter, behind which the Italians were massing artillery, tanks and infantry. Supported by British tanks from the 7th Royal Tank Regiment, the raid caught the defenders by surprise, resulting in the capture of over 360 more Italians, as well as large quantities of weapons and vehicles for only light casualties. In late May, a 2/48th patrol snuck out from the perimeter overnight, and evading German patrols, pushed 5 miles (8.0 km) south, where they set up an ambush and laid a series of land mines along a bypass track that was being used by German supply lorries, two of which were subsequently destroyed. In July, the battalion moved to the Bardia road sector, opposite the Italians. By October, the majority of the 9th Division, including the 2/48th Battalion, was withdrawn by sea as the British 70th Division arrived to take over the garrison. Overall, the 2/48th suffered 160 casualties at Tobruk, including 38 men killed and another 18 who died of their wounds.

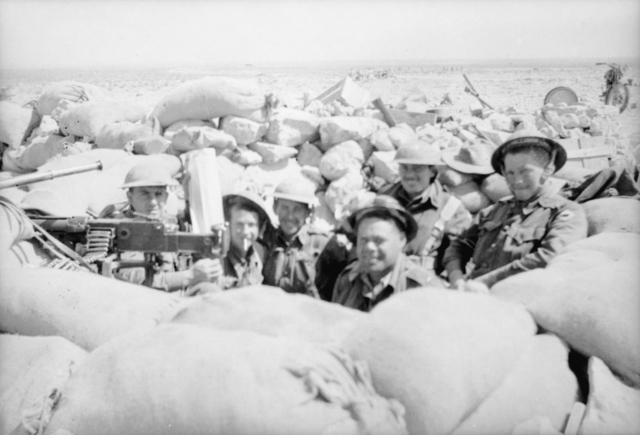
Members of the 2/48th Battalion manning a defensive position around Tobruk in 1941

After Tobruk, the 9th Division was sent to Palestine and Syria in order to train and rest, and to undertake garrison duties as part of the Allied occupation force that had been established their following the Syria–Lebanon campaign. Under their new commander, Lieutenant Colonel Heathcote Hammer—who had assumed command after Windeyer took over the 20th Brigade—the 2/48th proceeded to train in high terrain and temperatures.

In late June 1942, Axis forces commanded by General Erwin Rommel, crossed the Egyptian frontier as part of an offensive aimed at capturing Alexandria. After making a brief stand around Mersa Matruh, the British Eighth Army was forced to withdraw towards the Alamein line. In response, the 9th Division was transported south from Syria, and hurriedly committed to First Battle of El Alamein. On 1 July, Rommel's forces launched a determined assault on the Alamein line, and on 7 July the 9th Division was ordered to launch a counter-attack. As part of this plan, the 2/48th was ordered to traverse the coastline and capture the Trig 33 ridge north of the "Tel el Eisa" station, commencing their attack shortly before dawn on 10 July. After an initial artillery bombardment that disrupted the Italian troops, the main objective of the attack (Trig 33) was captured and 400 Italians were taken prisoner. The 2/48th then advanced south and captured Tel el Eisa station, which was successfully defended against a number of Axis counter-attacks. On 22 July, the battalion was ordered to capture West Point 24 on the Tel El Eisa ridge which was held by heavily entrenched Axis forces. However, after initial success, the 2/48th came under heavy artillery and mortar fire and was forced to withdraw, having suffered over 100 casualties. For actions during this attack, Private Stan Gurney was awarded the battalion's first Victoria Cross (VC) after he captured a machine-gun post and bayoneted the gun crew that was firing on his company, and then went on to capture a second post before being killed while taking a third. In total, the 2/48th suffered 215 casualties in the period 7 July to 23 October 1942, with 64 men killed, six dying of their wounds and 125 wounded.

In August, Lieutenant General Bernard Montgomery took over command of the British Eighth Army and he succeeded in preventing the Axis advance during the Battle of Alam el Halfa. Montgomery then began preparing for an Allied offensive against the Axis forces that were now entrenching themselves. The Second Battle of El Alamein started on 23 October and finished on 7 November with Axis forces withdrawing westwards towards Fuka to avoid encirclement. The 2/48th Battalion was engaged around Tel el Eisa, on the right of the Allied line near the coast, during this period, as the 20th and 26th Brigades pushed westwards and then endured numerous counterattacks as the Germans sought to regain control of the strategically important coast road. By the end of the month, the battalion had been heavily depleted. Having started with nearly 700 men in the line, after a week of fighting, the battalion could field only 41 fit men. As a result, the 26th Brigade was rotated out of the line just before the final German counterattack was repulsed, allowing the Allies to launch the final breakout phase of the operation.

For their actions during this offensive two members of the 2/48th were awarded Victoria Crosses. The battalion's second VC was awarded to Sergeant Bill Kibby for actions across a one-week period. Kibby had charged several Axis positions and was subsequently killed attacking an enemy position with grenades on 31 October. Private Percy Gratwick earned the battalion's third VC on 25 October in the same area as Kibby. His platoon had been reduced to seven men by enemy fire so Gratwick charged the nearest enemy position of his own volition. He killed the occupants, destroyed the post with grenades and was proceeding to neutralise another position when he too was killed. Overall, the 2/48th suffered a further 344 casualties in the period 23 October to 5 November 1942 with 85 men killed, 13 dying of their wounds and 243 wounded. These losses resulted in the battalion being withdrawn from the line just as the battle reached its climax in early November. As the Allies went on the advance, the battalion moved back to Tel el Eisa, during which time it was slowly rebuilt as men who had been wounded were returned to unit, or replaced by reinforcements; this process would continue into the new year.

After helping to secure victory at El Alamein the 9th Division moved to Gaza in Palestine on 3 December. Since the previous October, the Australian government had sought to bring the division back to Australia in order to use it against the Japanese in the Pacific, along with the 6th and 7th Divisions which had been withdrawn the year before, and on 15 December the British prime minister, Winston Churchill, had finally agreed to provide the necessary shipping. Following a divisional parade at Gaza, the 2/48th Battalion embarked upon the troopship Nieuw Amsterdam on 24 January 1943.

=== Fighting in New Guinea ===
The convoy carrying the battalion put into Fremantle in mid-February, where the small number of Western Australian personnel disembarked to begin their home leave. The rest of the battalion continued on to Port Melbourne, before moving to Adelaide by rail. In late March, after the South Australian personnel had completed their leave, the battalion was re-constituted. At that time, a series of parades were held in every Australian capital city to welcome home the 9th Division; the 2/48th marched through Adelaide. After this, the 2/48th were transported to the Atherton Tablelands in Queensland, where they established a camp on the Barron River, near Kairi. In April 1943, the battalion was re-organised and re-trained for jungle operations in the South-West Pacific theatre in order to prepare it for the conditions in New Guinea. Undertaking training on the Tablelands, the battalion was converted to the tropical establishment. Warfare in the Pacific posed unique problems and differed greatly to that which the 2/48th had experienced in North Africa. In the jungles of New Guinea logistics and transport were significant challenges and in order to meet them, the battalion's size was reduced by over 100 men, to around 800, as its anti-aircraft and Bren carrier platoons were disbanded, while each of the battalion's four rifle companies lost most of their organic motor transport; the mobility issue would be solved by marching on foot as vehicles were relatively useless in dense jungle, while supplies would be brought up using native carriers as well as by air. In July 1943, the battalion moved to Cairns where they undertook amphibious training with the American 532nd Engineer Boat and Shore Regiment around Trinity Beach as part of their final preparations before being committed to the fighting in New Guinea.

Sailing aboard the Henry T. Allen, after arriving in New Guinea in early August, the 2/48th established a camp around Milne Bay where they undertook further amphibious training, before taking part in the landing around Lae on 4 September 1943, as part of the final phase of the Salamaua–Lae campaign. This was the first large-scale amphibious landing conducted by the Australian forces since the landings at Gallipoli in 1915, and the battalion, along with the rest of the 26th Brigade, landed on Red Beach, about 10 miles (16 km) north-west of Lae. They subsequently advanced westwards, and on 14 September captured Malahang airstrip. Following the fall of Lae to the 7th Division—which had advanced from Nadzab as part of the two-pronged assault—on 16 September, the Allies hurriedly launched a follow-up campaign on the Huon Peninsula. Initially, only one brigade was committed to the operation, and so the 2/48th Battalion remained around Lae until the 26th Brigade was transported by sea to Finschhafen in late October in order to reinforce the 20th Brigade, which had landed the month previous in an effort to follow up troops withdrawing from Lae, before coming under heavy Japanese counterattack. During this time the battalion took part in repelling an attempted landing at Scarlet Beach, as the Japanese launched a counteroffensive against the Australian lodgement.

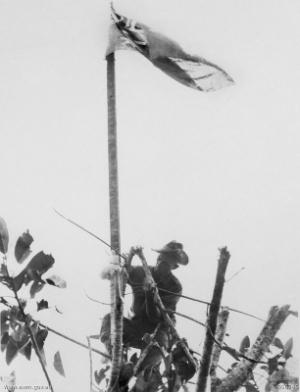
Tom Derrick raising the Australian flag over Sattelberg mission

After the Japanese counteroffensive was defeated in late October 1943, Australian attention turned to Sattleberg, the site of an abandoned Lutheran mission. The newly arrived 26th Brigade was chosen to lead the assault as it was fresher than the division's other brigades. The main advance began on 17 November, although the battalion took part in a preliminary attack on Green Ridge the previous day in order to secure the start line for the advance. Pushing north-west from Jivevaneng in company with Matilda tanks from the 1st Tank Battalion, the 2/48th began the drive towards Sattleberg. In difficult terrain and against stubborn Japanese defence, the advance made slow progress, nevertheless by 22 November Steeple Tree Hill was captured and the battalion reached the southern slopes of the Sattelberg feature, about 600 yards (550 m) from its summit.

On 24 November, the 2/48th's 'C' Company carried out a surprise attack on the position from the south-east. Crossing Siki Creek, the company stepped off shortly before 17:30 hours and reached the base of a steep cliff, from where they began their assault on the summit. Held up by machine gun fire and grenades that were lobbed from the Japanese position above, and finding it almost impossible to move up the hill which had a gradient of between 45 and 60 degrees, the attack appeared in danger of failure as light began to fade and ammunition ran low. However, the actions of one of the company's platoon commanders, Sergeant Tom Derrick, reinvigorated the attack. Laying his sections down to provide covering fire, he went forward alone armed with a rifle and a quantity of grenades, attacking the Japanese positions as he went. In the end he accounted for 10 such posts, before the attack was halted 100 yards (91 m) from the summit.

During the night, the company clung to the edge of the plateau upon which the Sattelberg mission was situated, as fresh supplies were brought up from the rear. The attack was resumed at 08:35 hours the next day, supported by heavy artillery and mortar fire, however, as the 2/48th crested the ridge they found the position unoccupied, with the Japanese having abandoned it the previous night. For his actions the previous day, Derrick was given the honour of raising the Australian flag over the mission and was later awarded a Victoria Cross—the battalion's fourth—to go with the Distinguished Conduct Medal he had received for actions during the fighting around El Alamein. Later, Derrick was sent to an Officer Training Unit, after which he was commissioned and, returned to the battalion as a lieutenant; this was a departure from usual Army policy and was the result of intensive lobbying on Derrick's behalf.

Following the capture of Sattelberg, the 2/48th continued the advance north along with the rest of the 26th Brigade, pushing on over difficult terrain to Wareo, where they arrived on 8 December. Following this, the Japanese began to fall back to Sio in retreat and the battalion's involvement in combat operations on the peninsula came to an end as troops from the 5th Division arrived to relieve them. In January, the battalion camped around the Dallman River before being withdrawn back to Finschhafen, camping around the Song River. In February 1944, the 2/48th was withdrawn back to Australia along with the 9th Division. Sailing aboard an American Liberty ship, the battalion landed in Brisbane on 20 February, and made camp at Kalinga before personnel marched out for a long period of home leave. During its time in New Guinea, the battalion had suffered 125 casualties, of which 36 were killed, three died of wounds, eight died of illness and 77 were wounded.

=== Landing on Tarakan ===
The battalion began reforming near Ravenshoe, on the Atherton Tablelands in April 1944. During this time the composition of the units of the 9th Division underwent significant changes as many men were discharged for medical reasons or transferred to other units and young replacements were brought in; many of the battalion's original members had been struck down by sickness during the fighting in New Guinea. A long period of training followed during which the battalion undertook a number of exercises, including amphibious operations with British Royal Marines on the Glenearn and HMS Empire Spearhead. Finally, following more than a year training in Australia the battalion was committed to its final deployment of the war, moving to Morotai Island in April 1945 in order to take part in the landing on Tarakan as part of Operation Oboe. Embarking from Cairns, the battalion was transported in two ships, the Sea Cat and the Van Heutz, the battalion arrived on Morotai later in the month, where the battalion undertook a series of manoeuvres, exercising with armour and at night, to prepare them for the coming campaign. On 22 April, the battalion embarked upon HMAS Manoora, practicing beach landings for a week before setting sail for their objective.

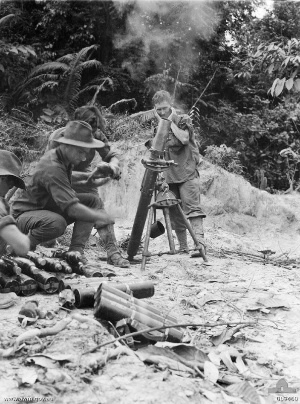
A 3-inch mortar team from 2/48th Battalion during the fighting on Tarakan

The entire 26th Brigade group was assigned the task of capturing Tarakan Island and destroying the Japanese garrison and the assault began on 1 May 1945. Embarking on Manoora, the 2/48th was in the first wave of the attack, leading the brigade in at 07:15 hours, landing on Red Beach, on the left flank of the lodgement, 2 miles (3.2 km) from Tarakan town on the western side of the island, with the 2/23rd on their right. The preliminary bombardment had been successful, and as the battalion came ashore they were largely unopposed, allowing the landing craft to get in close to the shore. Pushing inland, the 2/48th had secured its primary objectives by 08:38 hours. The right forward company took sporadic fire as it secured the oil tanks, while the battalion's left hand company was able to capture the bridge over the Sibengkok River and the high feature overlooking the landing beach without meeting any resistance.

Advancing inland, the Japanese pillboxes that had fired on the right forward company were secured after they were abandoned by the defenders. A company was then sent along the Anzac Highway to secure Collins Highway ridge. By 13:40 hours the western end of the ridge had been secured, however, the battalion began taking fire from the east. Forward momentum was maintained, although the 2/48th suffered a number of casualties, and by the end of the day a 2,000-yard (1,800 m) by 2,800-yard (2,600 m) beachhead had been established, and the battalion had companies on Collins Highway ridge, one on the "Parks" feature and another at "Finch". (Note: During the planning stage, the Australian staff had named a number of hills and features in order to make passing orders and planning simpler.)

Over the course of the next couple of days, Japanese resistance to the Australian advance increased. After the Australians secured the island's airfield and the low ground along the west coast, throughout May and into June significant engagements took place in the hills surrounding Tarakan town. On 2 May, the 2/48th captured Lyons Ridge, before pressing on towards Tarakan Hill, where they assaulted the "Sykes" feature supported by Matilda tanks from the 2/9th Armoured Regiment. Here they experienced their heaviest losses of the campaign, losing six killed and 26 wounded during the three assaults up the steep slopes of the feature. Their next major engagement came in late May when the 2/48th took part in fighting around Freda Ridge as part of the drive on the main Japanese position around Fukukaku. A company-level attack was put in and after stiff resistance the ridge was captured. The following morning, as the battalion waited for a Japanese counterattack, Tom Derrick, who had played a key role in capturing the position the previous day, was mortally wounded. He subsequently died on 24 May 1945.

In June, major combat operations on the island ceased and the Australians began the mopping up phase of the campaign as the Australians sought to clear isolated pockets of Japanese troops that had evaded capture. These operations continued into July. During this time, the 2/48th was assigned a sector near the Pamusian River on the eastern coast, as well as Tarakan town and the centre of the island. The battalion's involvement in the Borneo campaign resulted in 174 casualties, including 37 killed and nine died of wounds or from accident.

=== Disbandment ===
Following the end of hostilities in August, the battalion remained on Tarakan to undertake garrison duties. During this time it undertook patrol operations to bring in the various pockets of Japanese troops who had not learned of the surrender; these were dangerous operations and in an effort to reduce casualties, the patrols went out with several Japanese prisoners to help talk their former comrades into surrendering. As the demobilisation process began, its numbers dwindled as long-serving men were repatriated back to Australia, while others with only limited service were transferred to other units for further service. Finally, on 25 October 1945, while still on Tarakan, the battalion was disbanded. The occasion was marked by a small ceremony at Tarakan involving the unit's remaining members. The battalion's equipment was transferred to the newly raised 66th Battalion, along with a draft of volunteers for occupation duties in Japan with the British Commonwealth Occupation Force. Those that did not volunteer to serve in Japan were transferred to the 2/3rd Pioneer Battalion. During the course of the war a total of 2,838 men served with the 2/48th Battalion, of whom 343 men were killed in action or died on active service, 675 were wounded, and 20 captured.

According to the Australian War Memorial the 2/48th Battalion was "Australia's highest decorated unit of the Second World War". Four members of the battalion received the Victoria Cross, three of them posthumously. Other decorations awarded to members of the 2/48th included: four Distinguished Service Orders, 12 Military Crosses, 10 Distinguished Conduct Medals, 24 Military Medals and 36 Mentions in Despatches. (Note: Johnston's figures vary slightly from those of the AWM, which are: four VCs, four DSOs, 11 MCs, 10 DCMs, 23 MMs and 39 MIDs.)

== Commanding officers ==
The following officers commanded the 2/48th Battalion during the war:

- Lieutenant Colonel Victor Windeyer (9 August 1940 – 6 January 1942);
- Lieutenant Colonel Heathcote Hammer (8 January 1942 – 18 June 1943);
- Lieutenant Colonel Robert Ainslie (22 July 1943 – 12 August 1945).

== Battle honours ==
The 2/48th Battalion was awarded the 14 battle honours for its service during the war:

- North Africa 1941–42, Defence of Tobruk, El Adem Road, The Salient 1941, Defence of Alamein Line, Tell el Eisa, El Alamein, South-West Pacific 1943–45, Lae–Nadzab, Finschhafen, Defence of Scarlet Beach, Sattelberg, Borneo, Tarakan.

== Notes ==
Footnotes

Citations
