= 2/24th Battalion (Australia) =

Infantry battalion of the Australian Army

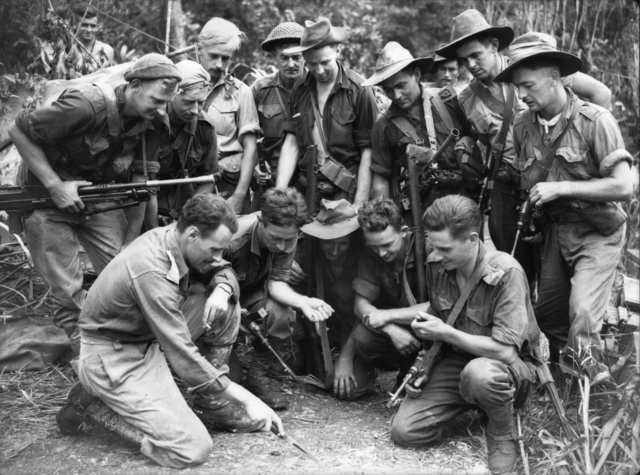
- Soldiers from the 2/24th prepare for a patrol around Sattelberg, November 1943
- Active: 1940–1946
- Country: Australia
- Branch: Australian Army
- Type: Infantry
- Size: ~800–900 personnel (Note: By the start of World War II, the authorised strength of an Australian infantry battalion was 910 men all ranks, however, later in the war it fell to 803.)
- Part of: 26th Brigade, 7th Division; 26th Brigade, 9th Division
- Nickname: "Wangaratta's Own"
- Engagements: World War II: Siege of Tobruk; First Battle of El Alamein; Second Battle of El Alamein; Huon Peninsula campaign; Borneo Campaign

Insignia
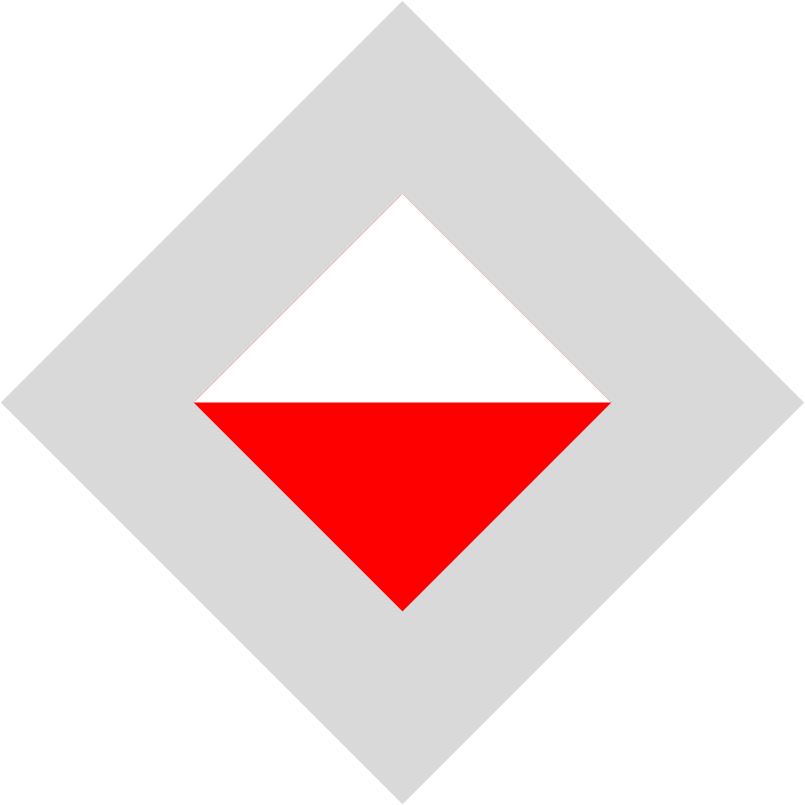
- Unit colour patch (1940–1942)

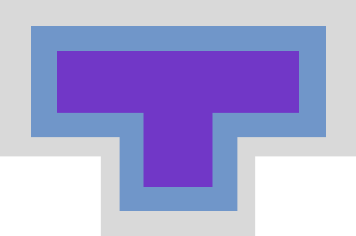
- (1942–1946)

The 2/24th Battalion was an infantry battalion of the Australian Army, which served during World War II. A unit of the all-volunteer Second Australian Imperial Force (2nd AIF), it was formed in July 1940 from primarily Victorian volunteers and was known as "Wangaratta's Own" because of the time the battalion spent in the town during its formative period prior to deployment overseas. It served in North Africa in 1941–1942 as part of the 26th Brigade, which was assigned to the 7th Division, before being reassigned to the 9th Division. In early 1943, the battalion returned to Australia and later took part in campaigns against the Japanese in New Guinea in 1943–1944 and Borneo in 1945, before being disbanded in 1946. The 2/24th suffered the highest number of battle casualties of any 2nd AIF infantry battalion.

== History ==
=== Formation and service in the Middle East ===
Assigned to the 26th Brigade along with the 2/23rd and 2/48th Battalions, the 2/24th Battalion (Note: The numerical designation of 2nd AIF units was prefixed by "2/", which was used to set them apart from Militia units with corresponding numerical designations.) was established in Caulfield, in July 1940. The battalion's first commanding officer was Lieutenant Colonel Allan Spowers, an Australian officer that had served in the British Army during World War I. Part of the all volunteer Second Australian Imperial Force, which was raised for overseas service during the war, the majority of the battalion's initial intake of personnel came from the state of Victoria. The colours initially chosen for the battalion's unit colour patch (UCP) were the same as those of the 24th Battalion, a unit which had served during World War I before being raised as a Militia formation in 1921. These colours were white over red, in a diamond shape, although a border of gray was added to the UCP to distinguish the battalion from its Militia counterpart; this was later changed, though, following the unit's involvement in the fighting during the Siege of Tobruk, as a result of which it was entitled to adopt a T-shaped UCP.

With an authorised strength of around 900 personnel, like other Australian infantry battalions of the time, the battalion was formed around a nucleus of four rifle companies – designated 'A' through to 'D' – each consisting of three platoons. After formation, the battalion was moved to Wangaratta, where it remained until its training facilities were ready in Bonegilla. Because of its time in Wangaratta, it became colloquially known as "Wangaratta's Own". Training was undertaken at Bonegilla, before the battalion was deployed to the Middle East, departing in November 1940, aboard the transport ship HMT Strathmore.

After arriving in the Middle East, the 26th Brigade was reassigned from the 7th Division to the 9th and, after completing further training in Cyrenaica, the battalion subsequently saw action for the first time around Tobruk in April 1941, after the strategically important port was placed under siege by German forces. The battalion remained there for eight months, occupying various positions around the perimeter before they were withdrawn by sea in late October 1941 along with the majority of the 9th Division. A period of garrison duties followed in Palestine and Syria before the 9th Division was hastily moved to El Alamein in response to a German advance through the desert towards Egypt. The 2/24th was subsequently heavily involved in both the First and Second Battles of El Alamein between July and November 1942. During the first battle, the battalion fought to secure Tel el Eisa where they captured a German intelligence unit; during the second battle the 2/24th advanced from Tel el Eisa towards the sea, amidst fierce fighting around a position dubbed the "Saucer".

=== Fighting in the Pacific ===
In December 1942, the 9th Division was concentrated in Palestine, following a decision to return it to Australia to take part in the fighting against the Japanese. The 2/24th subsequently sailed in early January 1943, making landfall in Melbourne the following month. They subsequently moved by train to Kairi on the Atherton Tablelands in Far North Queensland. For the majority of 1943, the battalion underwent a period of intense training as it was prepared for the rigours of jungle warfare. This saw the battalion re-organised in line with the jungle division establishment. In September, the 2/24th went into action again, taking part in an amphibious landing to advance on Lae, in New Guinea. The operation was quickly concluded and as the Australians sought to follow up the retreating Japanese, a further landing was made on the Huon Peninsula later in September. The 2/24th subsequently took part in actions around Finschhafen and then the assault on Sattelberg. They took part in the subsequent advance north to Wareo, during which they were mainly used to carry stores and ammunition, before being released from this task and taking part in the fighting around the Christmas Hills. They were transported back to Australia for rest in early 1944.

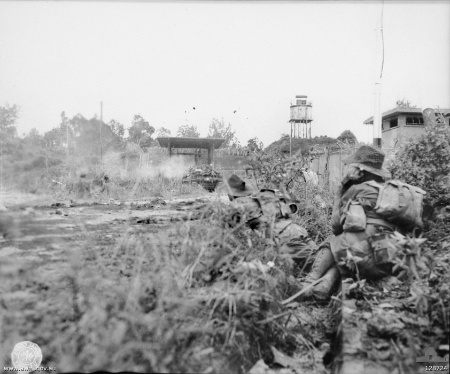
Troops from the 2/24th fighting on Tarakan, 1945

For over a year the 2/24th remained in Australia training on the Atherton Tablelands, waiting for further employment in the Pacific. During this time, the battalion received a large number of reinforcements, many of whom had previously served with the 6th Machine Gun Battalion, which had served in New Guinea prior to being disbanded. Finally, in April 1945 they were committed to Operation Oboe, the Allied campaign to retake Borneo and Java. After force concentrating the 7th and 9th Divisions on Morotai Island, the plan called for several landings around Borneo and its surrounding areas. The 26th Brigade's part in the operation was to capture the island of Tarakan. The main landing came on 1 May, during which the 2/24th formed the brigade's reserve. After the success of the initial landing, the 2/24th was committed to the fighting to secure the airfield on 2 May, but heavy fighting ensued as the Japanese defenders fought to hold on to the strategically important position, and the 2/24th were held up until 5 May. Following this, the battalion pushed into the rugged terrain inland, fighting a series of actions to secure the high ground overlooking the township. This fighting lasted up until 20 June, when Hill 90 was finally taken by the 2/24th. Mopping up operations followed as the battalion worked to clear Japanese stragglers from the oilfields to the north.

=== Disbandment ===
Following the end of hostilities in August 1945, the battalion's personnel were slowly transferred to other units for further service, or repatriated back to Australia for demobilisation. The remaining cadre sailed back to Australia in December 1945, and the battalion ceased to exist in early 1946, when its last remaining personnel marched out from Puckapunyal. A total of approximately 3,415 men served in the battalion throughout its existence. The battalion's casualties throughout the war amounted to 360 killed and 900 wounded; this was more than any other 2nd AIF infantry battalion.

Decorations awarded to 2/24th personnel included: four Distinguished Service Orders with one Bar, 12 Military Crosses, eight Distinguished Conduct Medals, 21 Military Medals, one British Empire Medal, five Efficiency Decorations and 35 Mentions in Despatches. In addition, two members of the battalion were appointed Officers of the Order of the British Empire and three were invested as Members of the Order of the British Empire.

== Battle honours ==
The 2/24th Battalion received the following battle honours:

- Busu River, Sattelberg, Wareo, Wareo–Lakona, Tarakan, Tel el Eisa, North Africa 1941–42, Defence of Tobruk, The Salient 1941, Defence of Alamein Line, El Alamein, South-West Pacific 1943–45, Lae–Nadzab, Finschhafen, Liberation of Australian New Guinea and Borneo.

== Commanding officers ==
The following officers served as commanding officer of the 2/24th:

- Lieutenant Colonel Allan Spowers (1940–1942)
- Lieutenant Colonel Charles Gladstone Weir (1942);
- Lieutenant Colonel Charles Hector Finlay (1942–1943);
- Lieutenant Colonel Andrew Basil Gillespie (1943–1945); and
- Lieutenant Colonel George Radford Warfe (1945–1946).

== Notes ==
Footnotes

Citations
