= 26th Brigade (Australia) =

Infantry brigade of the Australian Army during World War II

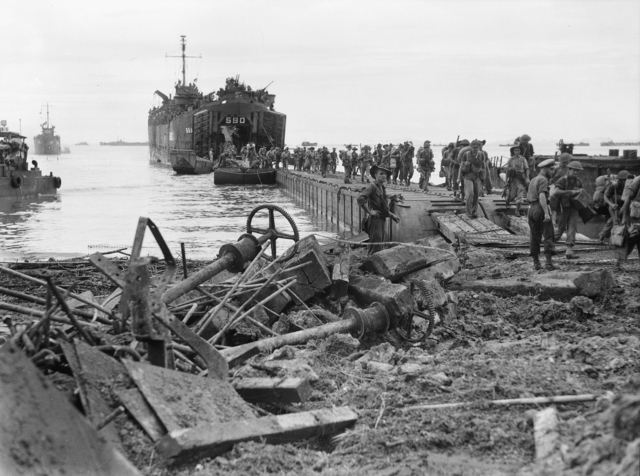
- 26th Brigade Headquarters landing on Tarakan Island from a LST in May 1945.
- Active: 1940–1946
- Country: Australia
- Branch: Australian Army
- Type: Infantry
- Size: Brigade
- Part of: 7th Division (1940–1941); 9th Division (1941–1946)
- Engagements: World War II: Western Desert Campaign; New Guinea campaign; Huon Peninsula campaign; Tarakan Island

Commanders
- Notable commanders: David Whitehead

Insignia
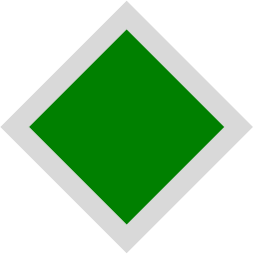
- Headquarters unit colour patch 1940–1942

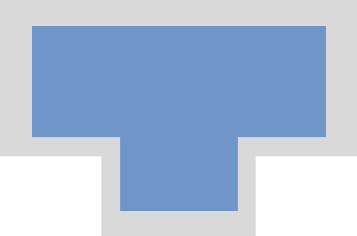
- 1942–1946

The 26th Brigade was an Australian Army infantry brigade of World War II. Formed in mid-1940, the brigade was assigned to the 7th Division initially, but later transferred to the 9th Division. It was primarily recruited from Victoria and South Australia. After training in Australia, in late 1940, the brigade deployed to the Middle East and subsequently took part in the siege of Tobruk, defending the vital port town between April and October 1941. After being relieved, the brigade undertook garrison duties in Syria in the first half of 1942, before taking part in the First and Second Battles of El Alamein between July and November 1942. After returning to Australia in early 1943, the brigade fought against the Japanese in New Guinea in 1943 and 1944, including the capture of Lae and the Huon Peninsula campaign, and then took part in the fighting on Tarakan in 1945. It was disbanded in early 1946.

== History ==
=== Formation and service in the Middle East ===
The 26th Brigade was raised on 22 July 1940 and formed part of the all volunteer Second Australian Imperial Force that was raised for overseas service during World War II. Under the command of Brigadier Raymond Tovell, the brigade consisted of three infantry battalions: the 2/23rd, 2/24th and 2/48th. The first two of these were recruited from the state of Victoria, while the third came from South Australia. Training for the Victorian units was undertaken around Albury, New South Wales, and Bonegilla, Victoria, while the South Australians trained around Woodside, South Australia. In November, the brigade embarked for the Middle East, with the Victorians embarking from Melbourne aboard the transport Strathmore, while the South Australians embarked upon Stratheden from Outer Harbor. The two ships then rendezvoused at sea for the voyage to Egypt, via Ceylon.

The brigade reached the Middle East in December 1940 and began training around Dimra Camp, in Palestine. Initially, it was assigned to the 7th Division, but in February 1941 it was transferred to the 9th Division with which it served throughout the war. In March 1941, the brigade was committed to the Western Desert campaign, following up the successes of the 6th Division against the Italians, occupying positions around Baracca. After the German offensive in Cyrenaica began, the brigade withdrew towards Tobruk, which fell under siege. Between April and October, the brigade formed part of the Allied garrison holding the vital port after it was surrounded. During this time, they held the western side of the defences, before taking part in fighting around an area that became known as The Salient in May. The 2/24th Battalion was heavily engaged during the fighting around Bianca, being reduced to half strength before the rest of the 26th Brigade, with reinforcements from the 18th Brigade restored the situation. Later, the brigade rotated around the perimeter, manning defensive positions throughout the siege. As British and Polish reinforcements arrived by sea, the 26th Brigade was withdrawn by the Royal Navy in late October.

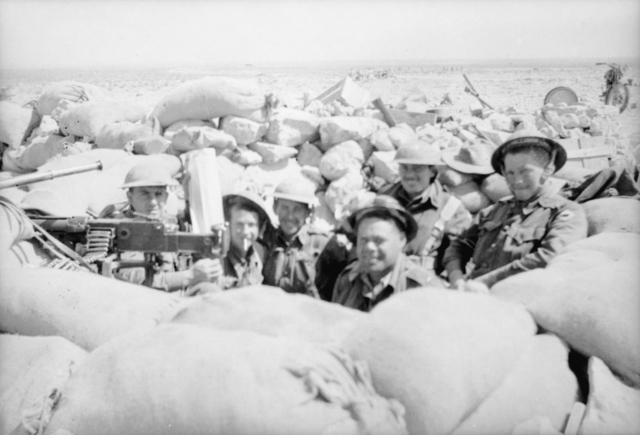
Members of the 2/48th Battalion manning a defensive position around Tobruk in 1941

Arriving in Palestine via Alexandria, the brigade was established at Julis for reorganisation, rest and training. In early 1942, the 9th Division was sent to Syria to relieve the 7th Division, which had been ordered to return to Australia following Japan's entry into the war. The 26th Brigade subsequently undertook occupation duties around Tripoli and Majlaya. Renewed fighting in the Western Desert resulted in the brigade being hastily redeployed to Egypt in July 1942. As the German offensive threatened Alexandria, the 26th Brigade initially occupied defensive positions around Amiriya before being sent forward. Throughout July and August, they took part in the First Battle of El Alamein, during which they fought several defensive actions around Tel el Eisa. In September, the brigade prepared for a coming offensive, during which time Brigadier David Whitehead assumed command of the brigade. Throughout October and early November, the brigade took part in the Allied offensive during the Second Battle of El Alamein, during which it undertook several attacks, pushing towards the coast as the Australians were assigned the task of achieving the initial break-in for other Allied forces to exploit. After a period of consolidation, the 9th Division was withdrawn to Palestine, establishing camp at Beit Jirja. In late January 1943, it was subsequently moved to Egypt in preparation for embarkation to return to Australia.

=== Fighting in New Guinea and on Tarakan ===
Embarking from Port Tewfik aboard the Nieuw Amsterdam, the brigade reached Melbourne in late February. A period of leave followed, after which the brigade concentrated at Kairi, Queensland, where the 9th Division was converted to the jungle division establishment and undertook training to prepare it for combat in New Guinea. This included amphibious warfare training around Cairns and then Milne Bay in July and August. In early September 1943, the brigade took part in operations to capture Lae. The brigade was in reserve for the initial amphibious assault, except for the 2/23rd Battalion which landed after the first wave from the 20th Brigade; the remainder of the 26th arrived as follow-on elements and then joined the advance along the coast towards Lae. The advance was slow, hampered by numerous river crossings and by 15 September Lae fell to the 7th Division, which had advanced from Nadzab. After a period of rest, the brigade joined operations on the Huon Peninsula. As the Australians advanced inland from Finschhafen the brigade fought significant actions at Sattelberg and Wareo, before playing a supporting role during the drive on Sio. After being relieved by Militia troops from the 5th Division, the brigade returned to Australia for rest in January – February 1944.

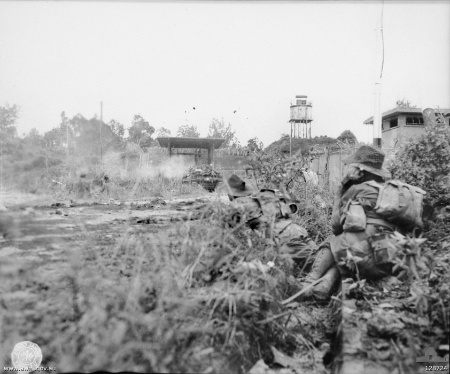
Troops from the 2/24th fighting on Tarakan, 1945

In May 1944, the brigade concentrated at Ravenshoe, Queensland, on the Atherton Tablelands after a period of leave. A period of uncertainty followed regarding the future employment of the Australian Army in the Pacific as US troops took the lead in the theatre around this time. Large numbers of personnel were discharged from the brigade's constituent units as part of a partial demobilisation to return soldiers to civilian industry; other personnel who had seen considerable active service were discharged for medical reasons. They were replaced by largely inexperienced personnel and so a period of intense training was undertaken. Eventually, in the final stages of the war, the brigade was assigned to the Borneo campaign. Within this campaign, the 26th Brigade was tasked with capturing Tarakan to secure an airfield for future operations in the area. In March 1945, the brigade moved to Morotai Island as part of a preliminary move ahead of the attack. On 1 May, the 2/23rd and 2/48th Battalions landed at Lingkas and the Australians began advancing inland. The 2/24th Battalion and the 2/3rd Pioneer Battalion consolidated positions around the beachhead while the 2/23rd secured the oilfield around Parmusian. Japanese resistance grew after the initial landing and fighting in bunkers and tunnels took place for several days before the high ground around the beachhead was secured on 4 May. The heavily damaged airfield was captured the following day, but the fighting in the hinterland continued for another six weeks, with minor actions continuing until the end of the war in mid-August.

Following the conclusion of hostilities, the 26th Brigade remained on Tarakan for several months undertaking garrison duties while personnel awaited repatriation to Australia for demobilisation. Initially there was a shortage of shipping available, which delayed the process. In October, around 300 personnel from the brigade volunteered for service with the British Commonwealth Occupation Force in Japan, forming part of the 66th Infantry Battalion. This unit later became part of the Royal Australian Regiment in the post war period. Throughout November and December 1945, drafts of personnel from the brigade embarked for Australia as ships became available. Finally, the 26th Brigade was disbanded in Brisbane on 25 January 1946. Around 9,447 personnel served in the brigade's three infantry battalions. Casualties amongst these men were high, with 764 being killed in action, 2,301 wounded and 415 captured. Another 244 died of their wounds, or from accidents or other causes. Five soldiers assigned to the brigade received the Victoria Cross during the war. Four of these – Stan Gurney, Bill Kibby, Percy Gratwick and Tom Derrick – served with the 2/48th Battalion, while the other, Jack Mackey, served with the 2/3rd Pioneers, which was temporarily assigned to the brigade during its final campaign of the war.

== Structure ==
The 26th Brigade typically consisted of:

- Brigade Headquarters
  - 2/23rd Australian Infantry Battalion
  - 2/24th Australian Infantry Battalion
  - 2/48th Australian Infantry Battalion

== Commanders ==
The following officers commanded the 26th Brigade during the war:

- Brigadier Raymond Tovell (1940–1942)
- Brigadier David Whitehead (1942–1945)
