= Battle of Tarakan (1945) =

First stage of the Borneo campaign in WWII

Coordinates: 3°21′0″N 117°34′0″E

- Part of the Pacific Theatre of World War II
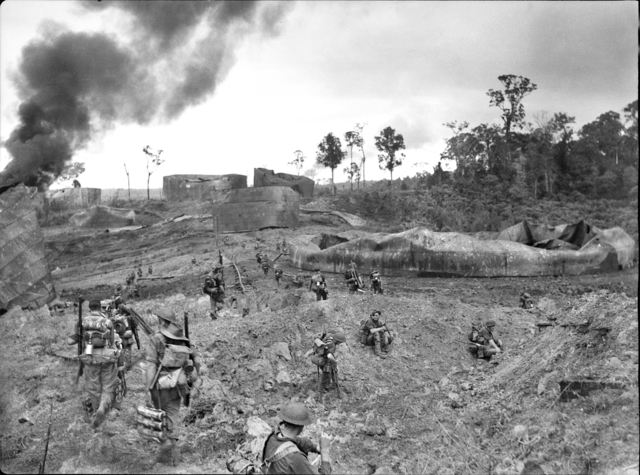
- Australian infantry advancing through wrecked oil storage tanks at Tank Hill, Tarakan
Date	1 May – 21 June 1945
Location	Tarakan Island, Dutch East Indies
Result	Allied victory

Belligerents
Allies; Australia; United States; Netherlands: (Netherlands) Dutch East Indies	Japan

Commanders and leaders
(Australia) David Whitehead	(Empire of Japan) Tadao Tokoi

Strength
15,532	2,200

Casualties and losses
251+ dead, 669+ wounded	1,540 dead, 252 captured prior to 15 August 1945
- At least 100 civilians killed or wounded

The Battle of Tarakan was an engagement fought between Allied and Japanese forces on the island of Tarakan off Borneo during May and June 1945. It formed the first stage in the World War II Borneo campaign. The Allies' main goal in attacking Tarakan was to capture the island's airfield and develop it into a base to support further offensives in the Borneo area.

After several weeks of preparatory air and naval bombardments Allied forces comprising the Australian 26th Brigade and a small Netherlands East Indies contingent conducted an amphibious landing in south-west Tarakan on 1 May 1945. This operation was heavily supported by Australian and United States air and naval units. The Japanese garrison had expected an attack and after several days of fighting withdrew to defensive positions in the centre of the island. It took several weeks of tough fighting for the Australian troops, who continued to be supported by Australian and US air units, to secure Tarakan. Most Japanese resistance ended in mid-June.

The airfield on Tarakan which was the main objective of the invasion was so heavily damaged by the pre-invasion bombardments that it could not be brought into service until the last phase of the Borneo Campaign. As a result, the battle is generally regarded as having not justified its costs to the Allies.

== Background ==
=== Geography ===
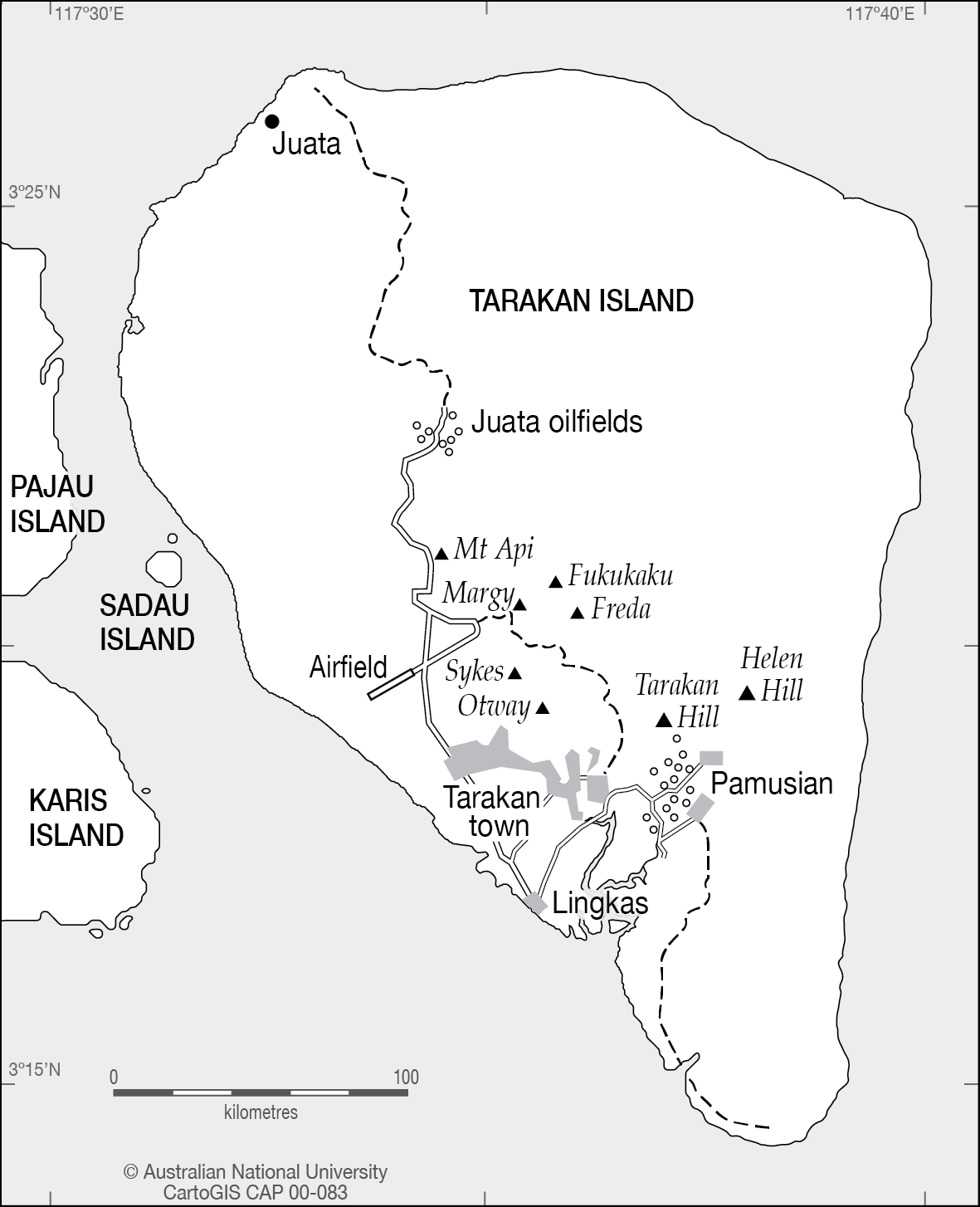
A map of Tarakan showing locations relevant to the fighting in 1945

Tarakan is a triangle-shaped island 2.5 miles (4.0 km) off the coast of Borneo. The island is roughly 15 miles (24 km) long from its northernmost point to the southern tip and 11 miles (18 km) wide towards the north of the island. The small island of Sadau is located about 0.5 miles (0.80 km) off Tarakan's west coast. Almost all of Tarakan's coastline is swampy, and in 1945 mangroves on the northern half of the island stretched 1 mile (1.6 km) to 2 miles (3.2 km) inland. The coastal mangroves in the southern portion of the island were narrower. Inland from the swamps, most of central Tarakan comprised a series of steep and densely forested hills just over 100 feet (30 m) high. Tarakan is located three degrees north of the equator and has a tropical climate. The maximum temperature for most days is about 80 °F (27 °C), and relative humidity is consistently high at about 90 percent.

In 1945, Tarakan Town was the main settlement of the island. This town was located 2,000 yards (1,800 m) inland, and was separated from the south-west coast by several small hills covered in low vegetation. Four piers used to dock oil tankers were located on this coastline at the settlement of Lingkas, and were connected to Tarakan Town by three surfaced roads. Tarakan airfield was located about 1 mile (1.6 km) north-west of Tarakan Town. Of the island's two oilfields, Sesanip Oilfield was located at the north-east edge of the airfield while the larger Djoeata or Juata Oilfield was 3 miles (4.8 km) to the north. The village of Djoeata was located on Tarakan's north-west coast and linked to Djoeata Oilfield by a track.

=== Japanese occupation ===
Prior to World War II, Tarakan formed part of the Netherlands East Indies (NEI) and was an important oil production centre. The island's two oilfields produced 80,000 barrels of oil per month in 1941. Securing Tarakan's oilfields formed one of Japan's early objectives during the Pacific War. Japanese forces landed on the island's east coast on 11 January 1942. They defeated the small Dutch garrison during two days of fighting in which half the defenders were killed in battle or executed thereafter. While the oilfields were sabotaged by the Dutch before surrendering, Japanese engineers were able to swiftly restore them to production. By early 1944 350,000 barrels of oil were being extracted from the island each month.

Tarakan's 5,000 inhabitants suffered under Japan's occupation policies. The large number of troops stationed on the island caused food shortages and many civilians suffered from malnutrition. The Japanese authorities brought 600 labourers to Tarakan from Java who were treated brutally. Approximately 300 Javanese women also travelled to Tarakan after receiving false offers of clerical and clothes-making jobs from the Japanese and were forced to work as prostitutes.

Tarakan's value to the Japanese evaporated with the rapid advance of Allied forces into the area during 1944. The last Japanese oil tanker left Tarakan in July 1944, and heavy Allied air raids later in the year destroyed the oil production and storage facilities. Hundreds of Indonesian civilians may have also been killed by these raids. The Allies also laid mines near Tarakan, which, combined with patrols by air and naval units, prevented Japanese merchant vessels and transports from docking at the island.

In line with the island's declining importance, the Japanese garrison on Tarakan was reduced in early 1945. One of the two infantry battalions stationed on the island (the 454th Independent Infantry Battalion) was withdrawn to Balikpapan. This battalion was destroyed by the Australian 7th Division in July during the Battle of Balikpapan.

== Planning ==
=== Allied strategy ===
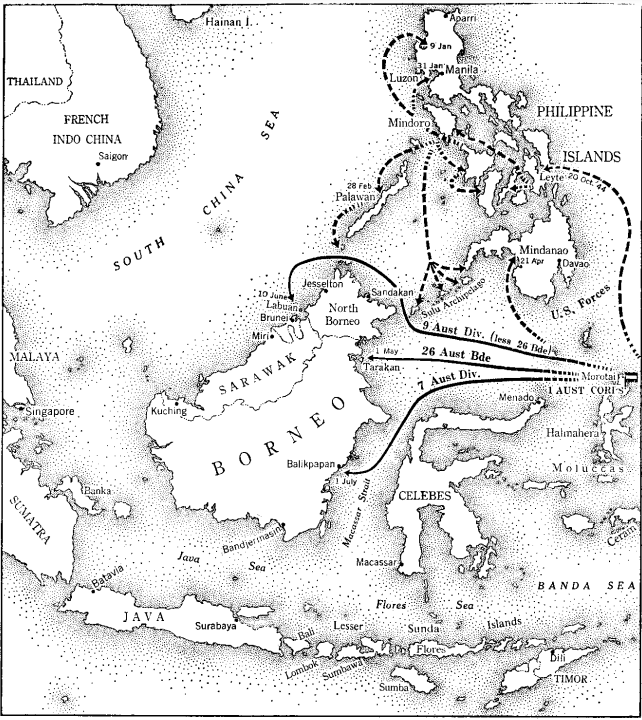
A map of the main Allied landings in Borneo and the Philippines during 1945

In late February 1945 General Douglas MacArthur, the commander of the Allied South West Pacific Area, issued plans for landings in the southern Philippines islands and Borneo. These operations would build on the success of the American forces that had liberated Leyte and most of Luzon in the Philippines during late 1944 and early 1945. The attack on Borneo formed part of what was designed Operation Oboe. MacArthur allocated the Australian forces under his command to Oboe, with the landings in the Southern Philippines (Operation Victor) being assigned to American units.

MacArthur justified Operations Victor and Oboe on the grounds that they would improve Allied prestige in the region, begin the process of re-establishing Dutch government in the NEI and ultimately free up American forces for the planned invasion of Japan. MacArthur also argued that the landings in Oboe would capture oilfields and ports that could be used by the Allied forces. The Australian government had been pressing MacArthur to use the Australian Army's I Corps in an operation that could improve Australia's standing during peace negotiations and he believed that Oboe would suit this purpose. This corps, which comprised two divisions of the Second Australian Imperial Force, had been out of action since early 1944. This had contributed to concerns in Australia that the country's military was being sidelined. MacArthur informed Australian Prime Minister John Curtin of the Oboe plan on 5 March. At this time MacArthur told the Australian Government that he would use I Corps' 7th and 9th Divisions in north Borneo and was considering using the 6th Division, which had been detached for operations in New Guinea, in Java. Senior Australian Army officers did not believe that the goals of Operation Oboe were worthwhile. In line with these concerns, Curtin withheld the 6th Division.

The initial aim of Operation Oboe was to first secure strategic locations in Borneo. Landings would then be made on Java in the Japanese-occupied NEI. The plan called for three landings on the east coast of Borneo; the landing on Tarakan was designated Oboe 1. It was to be followed by Oboe 2 at Balikpapan and Oboe 3 at Bandjarmasin. Allied troops would then be landed near Surabaya in Java as Oboe 4. Further planning added Oboe 5, which was to involve operations in the eastern NEI, and Oboe 6 which would capture the Brunei area in north-western Borneo. The attack on Java was dropped due when it wasn't authorised by the United States Joint Chiefs of Staff. This also led to the cancelation of Oboe 3, which had been intended to secure a base to support the landings on Java.

Further planning of Operation Oboe took place in early March. Operation Oboe 1 was scheduled for 1 May and assigned to the 26th Brigade, which was to be detached from the 9th Division. It would be followed by Oboe 6 on 10 June which would involve the remainder of the 9th Division. The 7th Division was allocated to Oboe 2, with the landing at Balikpapan being scheduled for 1 July. The landing forces in all three operations would be reinforced by additional units.

=== Planning for the attack on Tarakan ===
The primary objective for the Allied attack on Tarakan was to secure and develop the island's airstrip so that it could be used to provide air cover for subsequent landings in Brunei, Labuan and Balikpapan. The secondary objective for the operation was to secure Tarakan's oilfields and bring them into operation as a source of oil for the Allied forces in the theatre. The 3rd Company, Technical Battalion, KNIL was responsible for this.

The 9th Division and 26th Brigade headquarters were responsible for planning the invasion of Tarakan. This work began in early March when both units had arrived at Morotai, and the final plans were completed on 24 April. The planners' work was hampered by poor working conditions and difficulties in communicating with General MacArthur's General Headquarters at Leyte. As part of the planning process each of Tarakan's hills was assigned a code name (for instance "Margy" and "Sykes"); during the Australian Army's campaigns in New Guinea geographic features had been named on an ad hoc basis, and it was hoped that selecting names prior to the battle would improve the precision of subsequent planning and communications.

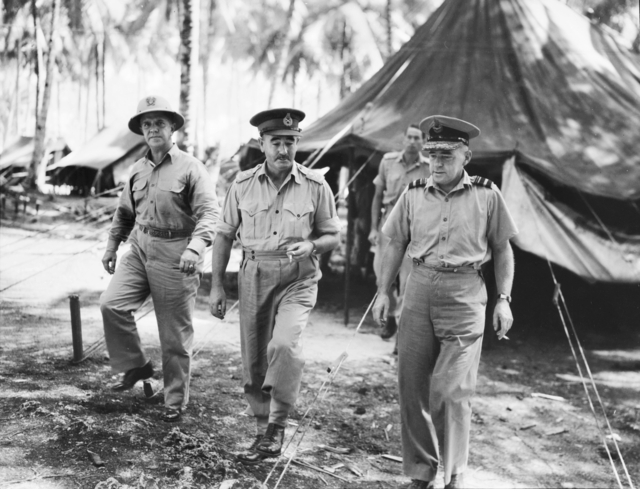
Rear-Admiral Forrest B. Royal, Lieutenant-General Sir Leslie Morshead and Air Vice-Marshal William Bostock during discussions of the planned landing at Tarakan on 12 April 1945

The Allied planners possessed detailed intelligence on Tarakan and its defenders. This intelligence had been gathered from a variety of sources which included signals intelligence, photographic reconnaissance flights and Dutch colonial officials. During the planning process the Allies believed that Tarakan was defended by a force of 4,000 men, including two infantry battalions. This estimate was considerably reduced shortly before the invasion when it was learned that one of the Japanese battalions had departed the island.

It was expected that Tarakan would be secured quickly. The planners anticipated that the operation would involve a short fight for the airfield followed by a consolidation phase during which the island's airfield and port would be developed. Significant fighting in Tarakan's interior was not foreseen, and no plans were developed for operations in areas other than the landing beaches, Tarakan Town and airfield. The planners did, however, correctly anticipate that the Japanese would make their main stand in an area other than the invasion beach and would not be capable of mounting a large counterattack.

The Allied plans also expected that Tarakan would be transformed into a major base within days of the landing. Under the pre-invasion planning it was intended that a wing of fighter aircraft would be based at Tarakan six days after the landing and this force would be expanded to include an attack wing nine days later and staging facilities for a further four squadrons of aircraft within 21 days of the landing. It was also expected that the 26th Brigade Group and its supporting beach group would be ready to leave Tarakan by 21 May and the RAAF units could be redeployed in mid-June after providing support for the landing at Balikpapan.

Tarakan was the Australian Services Reconnaissance Department's (SRD) first priority from November 1944. Prior to the invasion, I Corps requested that the SRD provide intelligence on Japanese positions in northern and central Tarakan. A five-man strong party landed on the island on the night of 25/26 April and reconnoitred the defences on Tarakan's north coast, though the operative who was assigned to the centre of the island became lost and did not reach this area. The SRD operatives withdrew from Tarakan on the night of 29/30 April and landed on the mainland of Borneo. They were unable to transmit the intelligence they had collected, however, as their radio set malfunctioned. Members of the party eventually landed within the Allied beachhead on Tarakan on 3 May to report to the 26th Brigade, but Whitehead was disappointed with the results of this operation and made no further use of the SRD during the battle.

=== Japanese plans ===
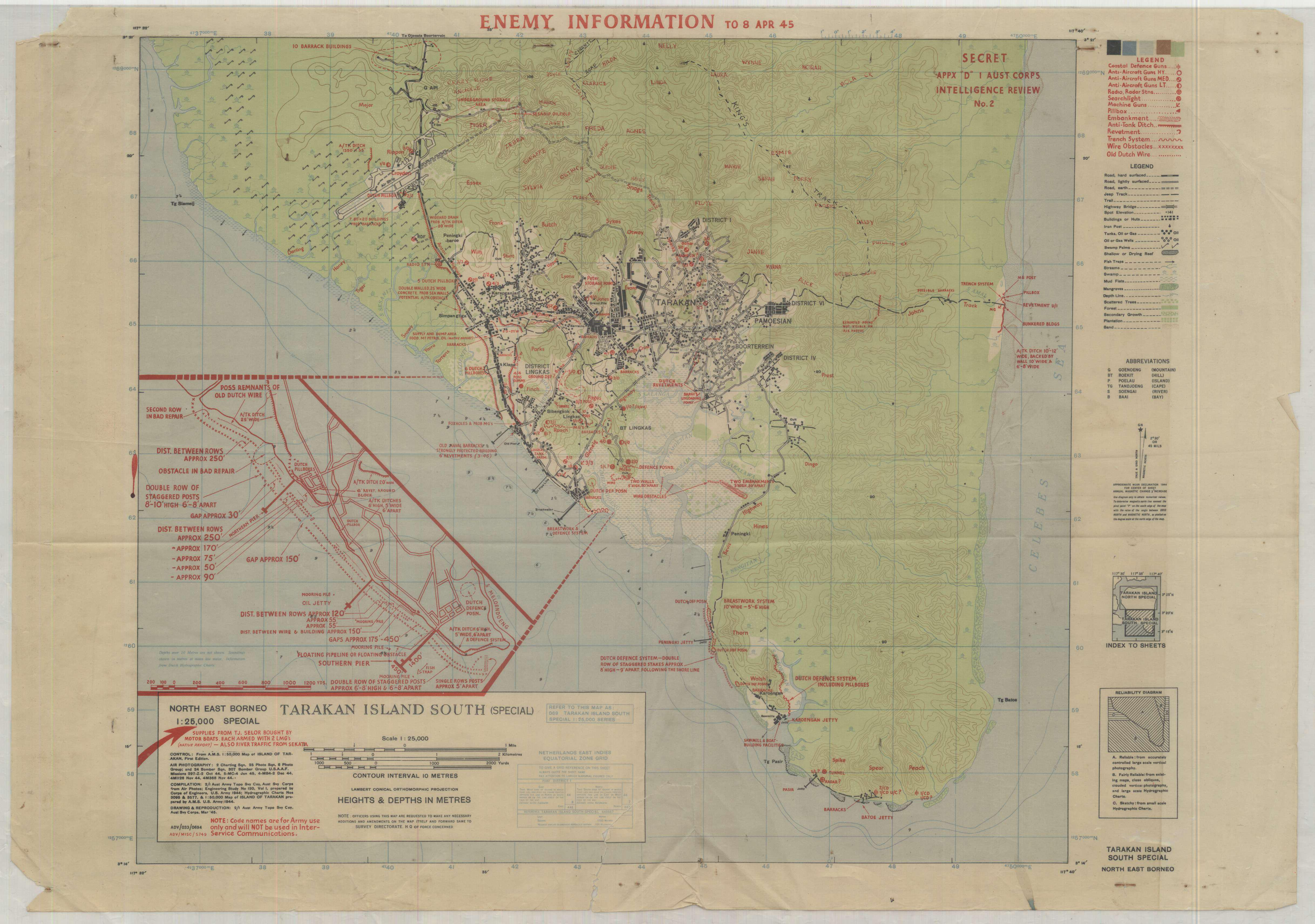
Allied intelligence estimates of Japanese defences as of April 1945 and code names for locations in southern Tarakan

In line with what had become the standard Japanese defensive doctrine by this stage of the war, Tarakan's coastal areas were considered impossible to defend for a prolonged period. As a result, plans for defending the island were focused on holding a redoubt in the interior of Tarakan. Several mutually supporting defensive positions located on hills and ridges were constructed. These fixed defences were used extensively during the battle. The Japanese did not conduct any large counter-attacks following the Allied invasion. Small parties of raiders were dispatched to infiltrate the Australian lines though.

Tarakan's defenders spent the months before the invasion constructing defensive positions and laying mines. The Japanese did not have any effective anti-aircraft weapons and lacked armoured vehicles and artillery. The garrison also had little ability to move forces around Tarakan, as it had few transport vehicles or engineers. The Imperial Japanese Navy and Japanese air units in South East Asia were weak, but posed a potential threat to the invasion force.

== Opposing forces ==
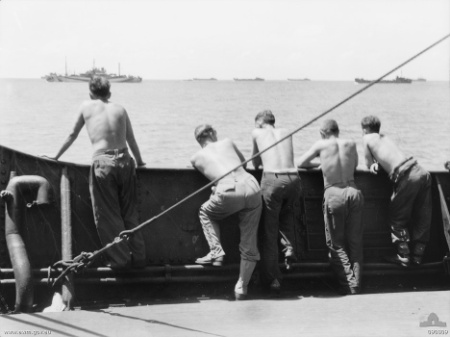
Soldiers from the 2/48th Battalion watch part of the convoy taking them to Tarakan

=== Allies ===
The Allied force responsible for capturing Tarakan was centred around the very experienced Australian 26th Brigade Group of nearly 12,000 soldiers. The 26th Brigade had been formed in 1940 and had seen action in North Africa and New Guinea. The brigade's infantry component was the 2/23rd, 2/24th and 2/48th Battalions, also with much war experience. These battalions were joined by the 2/4th Commando Squadron and the 2/3rd Pioneer Battalion, which fought as infantry in this battle. The brigade group also included the 2/7th Field Regiment equipped with 24 25-pounder guns, a squadron from the 2/9th Armoured Regiment operating 18 Matilda tanks, a company of the 2/2nd Machine Gun Battalion, the 53rd Composite Anti-Aircraft Regiment and two engineer field squadrons. These combat units were supported by a large number of logistics and medical units, including the 2nd Beach Group whose role was to land supplies from the invasion fleet. While the 26th Brigade Group greatly outnumbered the known strength of Tarakan's Japanese defenders, the Allies committed this large force as their previous experience indicated that it would be difficult to defeat the Japanese force if it retreated into Tarakan's rugged interior.

The 26th Brigade Group was supported by Allied air and naval units. The air units were drawn from the Australian First Tactical Air Force (1 TAF) and United States Thirteenth Air Force and included fighter and bomber squadrons. The naval force was drawn from the United States Seventh Fleet and included several Royal Australian Navy warships and transports. Since the main objective of attacking Tarakan was to use the island's airstrip, the invasion force also included a large number of Royal Australian Air Force ground units, including No. 61 Airfield Construction Wing comprising No. 1 and No. 8 Airfield Construction Squadrons.

The force which landed on Tarakan included nearly a thousand United States and Dutch troops. The U.S. troops included the U.S. Army engineers who manned the invasion force's LCMs and LCVPs and the U.S. Army's 727th Amphibian Tractor Battalion, Co. A, who manned the LVTs and United States Navy Seabee detachments aboard the Landing Ship Tanks. The Dutch forces were organised into a company of Ambonese infantry commanded by Dutch officers and a civil affairs unit.

=== Japan ===
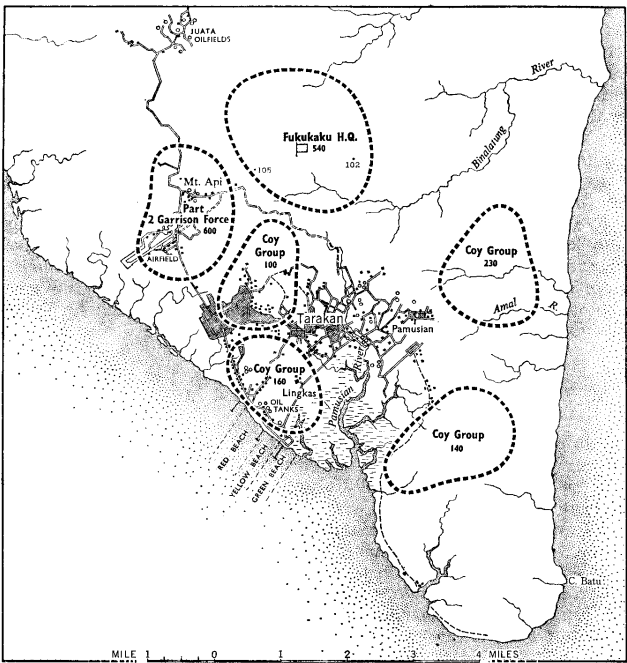
A map showing the disposition of the main Japanese sub-units on Tarakan as of 1 May 1945

At the time of the Allied landing, the Japanese force on Tarakan numbered approximately 2,200 men drawn from the Imperial Japanese Army and Imperial Japanese Navy. The largest unit was the 455th Independent Infantry Battalion which was commanded by Major Tadao Tokoi (Japanese: 常井忠雄). This was a second-rate unit that had been formed for garrison duties. It had few heavy weapons and no vehicles or horses for transport. The 455th Independent Infantry Battalion had arrived on Tarakan in December 1944. It comprised either 740 or just under 900 men. Another 150 Army support troops were also on Tarakan. A home guard unit comprising about 50 Indonesians had been recruited in early 1945 and was considered by the Japanese to be the most efficient such unit in the Borneo area. Major Tokoi directed the overall defence of Tarakan, though relations between the Army and Navy were poor.

The Imperial Japanese Navy's contribution to Tarakan's garrison comprised 980 seamen commanded by Commander Kaoru Kaharu. The main naval unit was the 600-strong 2nd Naval Garrison Force. This included a beach defence unit with around 250 men who manned several coastal defence guns and were also trained to fight as infantry. Other elements of the 2nd Naval Garrison Force included a ground defence company as well as small engineer, medical and supply units. The naval forces on the island also included approximately 280 naval pioneers and personnel assigned to fuelling and other installations. The Japanese expected all military support personnel to take part in combat following an Allied invasion. The 350 Japanese civilian oil workers on Tarakan were also required to fight.

Prior to the invasion, most of the Japanese forces on Tarakan were deployed in six groups in the south and centre of the island. Four company-sized forces were deployed separately in positions that had been sited to protect the probable landing beaches at Lingkas and the island's south-east coast. A force of approximately 400 men from the 2nd Naval Garrison Force was stationed at the airfield. Most of the remaining troops were assigned to a headquarters position located in the centre of Tarakan; this was also designated the final defensive position.

== Preparatory operations ==
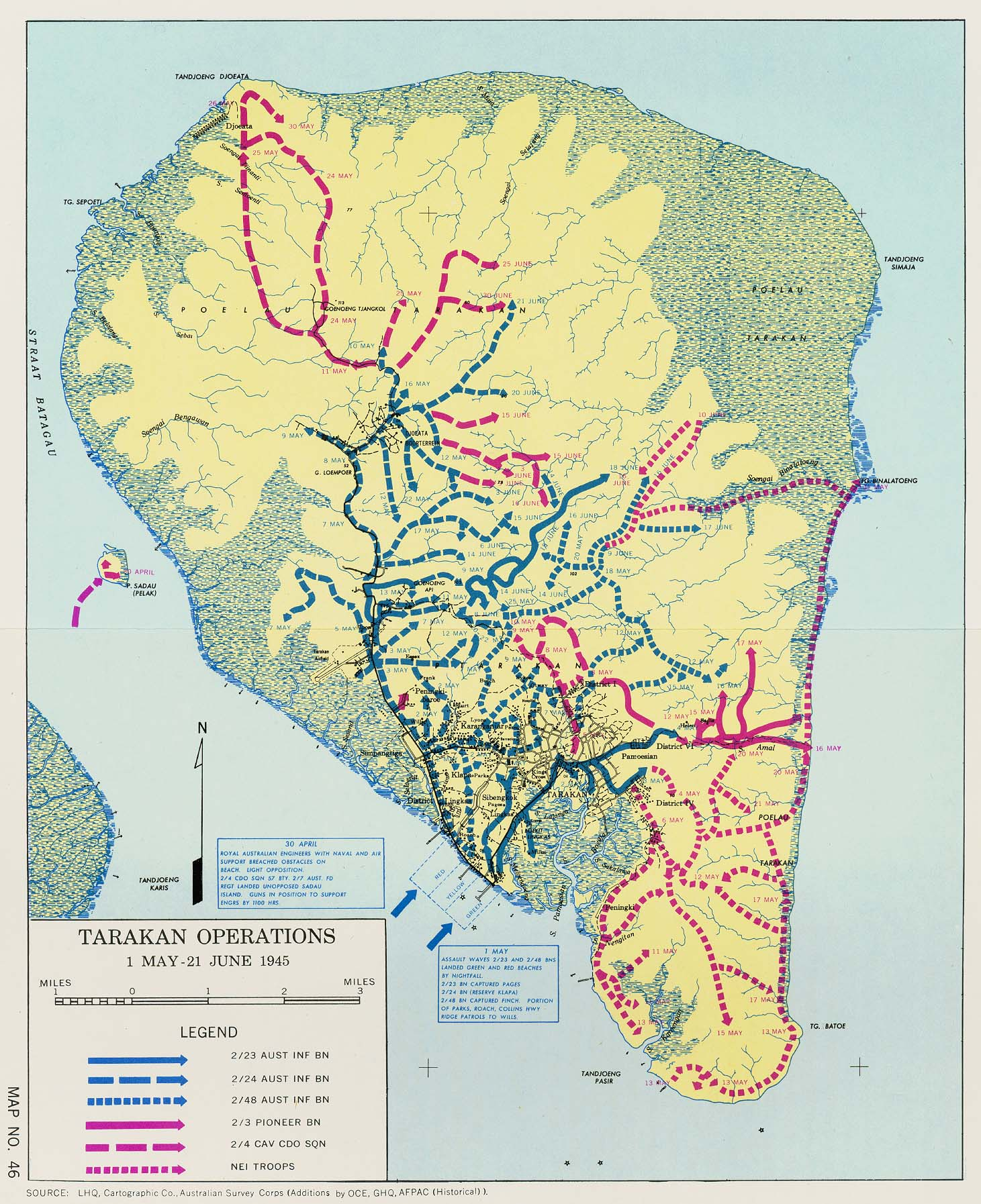
A map showing the movements of Allied units during the battle

The Japanese force on Tarakan was warned of the impending invasion in April, before the Allies began their pre-invasion bombardment of the island. The island's commander received a radio signal warning him of imminent attack, and the commander of Tarakan's oil depot was ordered to destroy the oil wells on 15 April. It is possible that this warning may have been issued as a result of a security leak from either the Chinese Republican Army's representative to Australia or MacArthur's headquarters. This did not have any effect on the subsequent battle, however, as the Japanese had been preparing defences to resist invasion for several months and the Japanese were aware of the large Allied force which was being assembled at Morotai to attack Borneo.

Prior to the arrival of the invasion force the Japanese garrison on Tarakan and Borneo was subjected to intensive air and naval attacks from 12 April to 29 April. The RAAF and USAAF also mounted air attacks against Japanese bases in China, French Indochina and the NEI to suppress Japanese air units throughout the region. These attacks destroyed all Japanese aircraft in the Tarakan area. The aerial bombing of Tarakan increased in intensity five days before the landing. These attacks were focused on the areas adjoining the planned landing beaches at Lingkas and sought to neutralise the Japanese defences in these areas. The oil storage tanks at Lingkas were a key objective as it was feared that the oil in these tanks could be ignited and used against Allied troops. These bombardments forced much of Tarakan's civilian population to flee inland. At least 100 civilians were killed or wounded.

The Tarakan attack force was assembled at Morotai during March and April 1945. The 26th Brigade Group was transported from Australia to Morotai by United States Army transports and arrived in mid-April and began to prepare their equipment for an amphibious landing. Due to a shortage of shipping all units were ordered to leave non-essential vehicles at Morotai when they began to embark onto assault transports on 20 April. The commander of the 1st Tactical Air Force attempted to resist this order, but was over-ridden by his superior officer Air Vice Marshal William Bostock. Most units were embarked by 22 April and the assault troops practiced landing operations for several days. A small convoy of ships carrying a force ordered to capture Sadau Island off the coast of Tarakan left Morotai on 26 April, and the main invasion convoy of 150 ships sailed the next day.

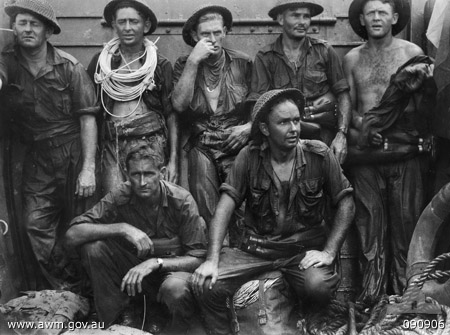
Engineers from the 2/13 Field Company rest after clearing beach defences

Due to the need to clear both the large number of naval mines which had been laid around Tarakan and the extensive beach obstacles at Lingkas, the Allies did not attempt a surprise landing. A group of United States Navy minesweepers and destroyers arrived off Tarakan on 27 April and began clearing mines, most of which had been originally laid by Allied aircraft. This operation was completed by 1 May at a cost of two small minesweepers damaged. USN PT boats also arrived off Tarakan on 28 April and illuminated and strafed the invasion beaches at night to prevent the Japanese from repairing their beach defences. The PT boats also attacked seven small Japanese freighters and luggers which were found anchored at Lingkas, sinking or damaging all but one of them.

On 30 April, the 2/4th Commando Squadron and the 57th Battery of the 2/7th Field Regiment were landed on the nearby Sadau Island in order to support the engineers tasked with clearing the obstacles off the invasion beaches. This force rapidly secured the undefended island. The landing on Sadau Island was the first time Australian soldiers had landed on non-Australian territory in the Pacific since late 1941 (Australian participation in the New Guinea Campaign from 1942 onwards was limited to the Australian portion of New Guinea). The only Allied losses in this operation were aboard USS Jenkins, which was damaged when she struck a mine while supporting the landing.

The task of clearing the beach obstacles at Lingkas was assigned to the 2/13th Field Company. These defences comprised rows of barbed wire, wooden posts and steel rails which extended 125 yards from the beach. At 11:00 on 30 April, eight parties of engineers went forward in LVTs and landing craft to clear the obstacles. The engineers were supported by the guns on Sadau Island and Allied warships and aircraft. Operating under Japanese fire the engineers cleared all the obstacles obstructing the landing beaches. While heavy casualties had been expected, the 2/13th completed their task without loss.

== Battle ==
=== Landing ===
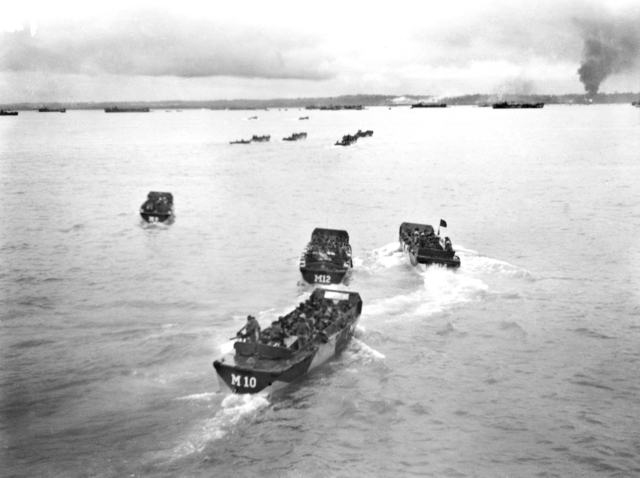
The second wave of the 2/48th Infantry Battalion leaving HMAS Manoora

The main invasion force arrived by sea off Tarakan in the early hours of 1 May. Supported by a heavy air and naval bombardment, the 2/23rd Battalion and the 2/48th Battalion made an amphibious landing at about 08:00. The 2/23rd Battalion disembarked from American LVTs into deep mud at "Green Beach" on the southern flank of the beachhead, and overcame several small Japanese positions in the hills around Lingkas. At nightfall it dug in along the main road to Tarakan Town (which had been designated the "Glenelg Highway" by the Australian planners). The 2/48th Battalion had a much easier landing at "Red Beach" on the northern end of the beachhead with most troops disembarking from their LVTs near dry land. The battalion pushed north along the "Anzac Highway" and nearby hills, and rapidly secured a number of pillboxes behind the beach as well as the oil storage tanks. By the end of the day the 2/48th held positions in the hills to the west of Tarakan Town. The 2/24th Battalion also began landing on Red Beach from 9.20 am, and spent most of the day in reserve. The unit received orders to advance north along the Anzac Highway late in the afternoon, but did not encounter any opposition. By nightfall the Australian beachhead extended for 2,800 yards (2,600 m) along the shore and up to 2,000 yards (1,800 m) inland. However, Japanese snipers were active within this perimeter during the night of 1/2 May, and the 2/2nd Pioneer Battalion (which formed the main unit of the 2nd Beach Group) fought several small battles with isolated Japanese forces. Allied casualties were lighter than expected, with 11 men killed and 35 wounded. The light Japanese resistance was attributed to the heavy pre-landing bombardment forcing Tarakan's defenders to abandon the formidable defences at Lingkas.

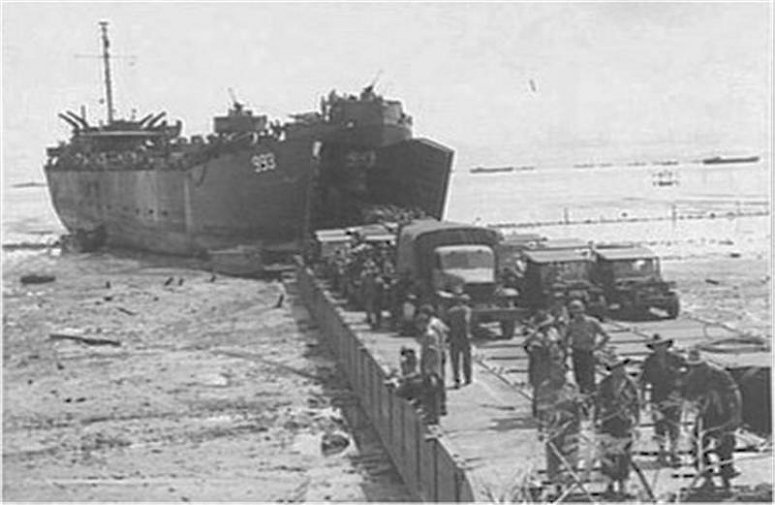
A beached US Navy LST at Tarakan on 1 May 1945

While the infantry were successful in securing a beachhead, the landing was hampered by the poor beach conditions. Many Australian vehicles became bogged in Lingkas Beach's soft mud, and seven LSTs were stranded after their commanders misjudged the ships' beachings. The small amount of solid ground within the beachhead lead to severe congestion and resulted in none of 2/7th Field Regiment's guns being brought into action until the afternoon of the landing. The congestion was made worse by much of the RAAF ground force being landed on 1 May with large numbers of vehicles. The seven LSTs were not refloated until 13 May.

After securing the beachhead, the 26th Brigade Group advanced east into Tarakan Town and north towards the airstrip. The Australians encountered increasingly determined Japanese resistance as they moved inland. The task of capturing Tarakan's airstrip was assigned to the 2/24th Battalion. The Battalion's initial attack on the airstrip on the night of 2 May was delayed when the Japanese set off large explosive charges, and the airstrip was not secured until 5 May. While the capture of the airfield achieved the 26th Brigade Group's main task, the Japanese still held Tarakan's rugged interior.

During the first week of the invasion, 7,000 Indonesian refugees passed into the advancing Australian lines. This was a larger number than had been expected, and the refugees, many of whom were in poor health, overwhelmed the Dutch civil affairs unit. Despite the devastation and casualties caused by the Allied bombardment and invasion, most of the civilians welcomed the Australians as liberators. Hundreds of Indonesian civilians later worked as labourers and porters for the Allied force.

General Thomas Blamey, the commander of the Australian Military Forces, made an inspection tour of Tarakan on 8 May. During a meeting with Whitehead, Blamey directed that the 26th Brigade Group should "proceed in a deliberate manner" in clearing the rest of the island now that the main objectives of the invasion had been completed.

=== Securing the interior ===
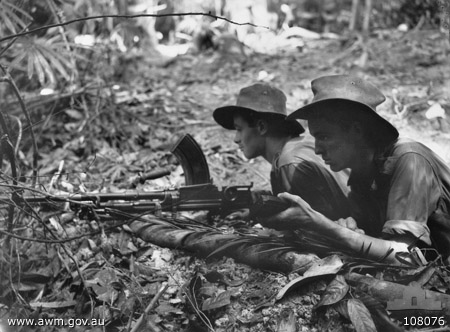
Two soldiers from the 2/23rd Battalion during the attack on 'Freda' feature

In order to secure the island and protect the airstrip from attack, the 26th Brigade Group was forced to clear the Japanese from Tarakan's heavily forested hills. Approximately 1,700 Japanese troops were dug into positions in the north and centre of the island. These positions were protected by booby traps and mines. While attacking these positions necessarily entailed costly infantry fighting, the Australian troops made heavy use of their available artillery and air support to minimise casualties. The Australian tanks could only provide limited support to the infantry as Tarakan's thick jungle, swamps and steep hills often confined their movement to tracks and roads. As a result, tanks generally could not be used to spearhead attacks, and their role was limited to providing supporting fire for infantry assaults, with artillery being the preferred source of direct support.

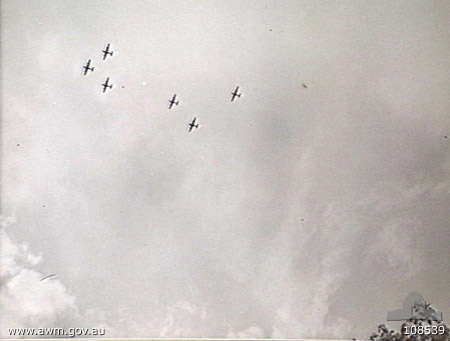
Six B-24 Liberators supporting the 2/23rd infantry battalion, making a bombing run over Japanese positions on 'Margy' feature

The 2/3rd Pioneer Battalion and the NEI company were assigned responsibility for securing the south-eastern portion of Tarakan. The pioneers began advancing east of Tarakan Town on 7 May but encountered unexpectedly strong Japanese resistance. From 10 May, the battalion was halted at the 'Helen' feature, which was defended by about 200 Japanese troops. On 12 May Corporal John Mackey was killed after capturing three Japanese machine gun posts. Mackey was posthumously awarded the Victoria Cross for this act. During the fighting at 'Helen' B-24 Liberator heavy bombers were used for close air support for the first time, with P-38 Lightning fighters dropping napalm immediately after the bombing. This combination proved particularly effective, and became the standard form of air support requested by the Australians. The Japanese force withdrew from 'Helen' on 14 May after suffering approximately 100 casualties, and the 2/3rd Pioneer Battalion reached Tarakan's eastern shore on 16 May. The battalion suffered 20 killed and 46 wounded in this operation. During this period the NEI company secured the remainder of southern Tarakan, and encountered little resistance during its advance.

The United States and Australian navies continued to support the invasion once the landing was complete. USN PT boats sank at least a dozen small craft off Tarakan and in rivers on the coast of Borneo between 1 and 10 May. The PT boats carried Netherlands Indies Civil Administration interpreters on most patrols who interrogated local residents to gather information on Japanese movements. The Japanese battery at Cape Djoeata on Tarakan's north coast was also knocked out by USS Douglas A. Munro on 23 May.

The Japanese garrison was gradually destroyed, with the survivors abandoning their remaining positions in the hills and withdrawing to the north of the island on 14 June. On this day 112 Chinese and Indonesian labourers left the Japanese-held area with a note from a senior Japanese officer asking that they be well treated. While Radio Tokyo announced that Tarakan had fallen on 15 June, the last organised Japanese resistance was encountered on 19 June and Whitehead did not declare the island secure until 21 June.

=== Construction problems ===
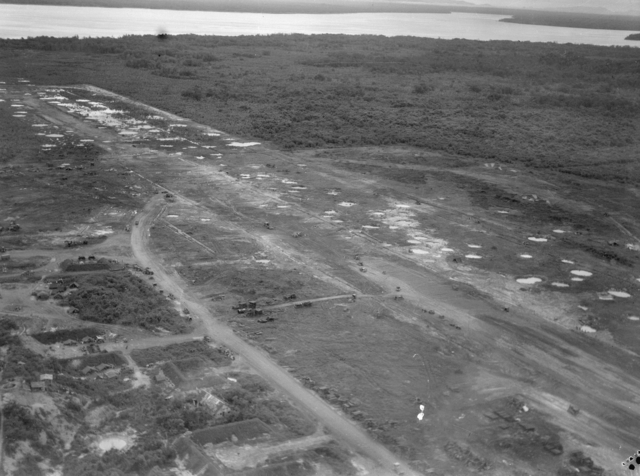
Tarakan Airstrip two weeks after its capture. Note extensive cratering.

While the infantry of the 26th Brigade Group fought the Japanese in the hills, the RAAF engineers of No. 61 Airfield Construction Wing were engaged in a desperate effort to bring Tarakan's airstrip into operation. As the airstrip had been heavily damaged by pre-invasion bombing and lay in marshy terrain it proved much more difficult to repair than had been expected, and it took eight weeks and not the expected single week to restore the strip to a usable state. Extensive use was made of Marston Mat, interlocking steel plates laid down like matting. Remnants of the plates still exist in the car park at Tarakan airport.

While the airstrip was finally opened on 28 June, this was too late for it to play any role in supporting the landings in Brunei or Labuan (10 June), or the landings at Balikpapan. However No. 78 Wing RAAF was based on Tarakan from 28 June and flew in support of the Balikpapan operation until the end of the war.

Efforts to restart production at Tarakan's oilfields were delayed by serious damage to the facilities and Japanese holdouts, and they did not become operational until after the war.

=== Mopping up ===
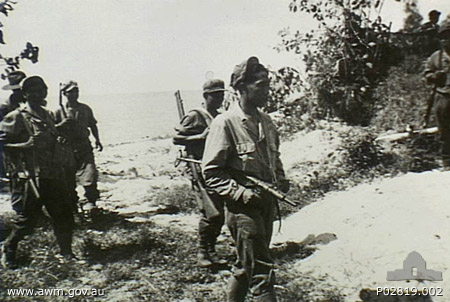
A joint Australian-NEI patrol in a remote part of Tarakan

Following the end of organised resistance the surviving Japanese on Tarakan split into small parties which headed to the north and east of the island. The 26th Brigade Group's main combat units were allocated sections of Tarakan which they swept for Japanese. Many Japanese attempted to cross the strait separating Tarakan from the mainland but were intercepted by Allied naval patrols. Allied troops also searched for Japanese on Bunyu Island, fifteen miles north-east of Tarakan.

From the first week of July the surviving Japanese became short of food and attempted to return to their old positions in the centre of the island and raid Australian positions in search of food. As their hunger increased more Japanese surrendered. The Australian units continued to patrol in search of Japanese until the end of the war, with several Japanese being killed or surrendering each day. These operations cost the 26th Brigade Group a further 36 casualties between June 21 and August 15. Approximately 300 Japanese soldiers evaded the Allied patrols, and surrendered at the end of the war in mid-August.

== Aftermath ==
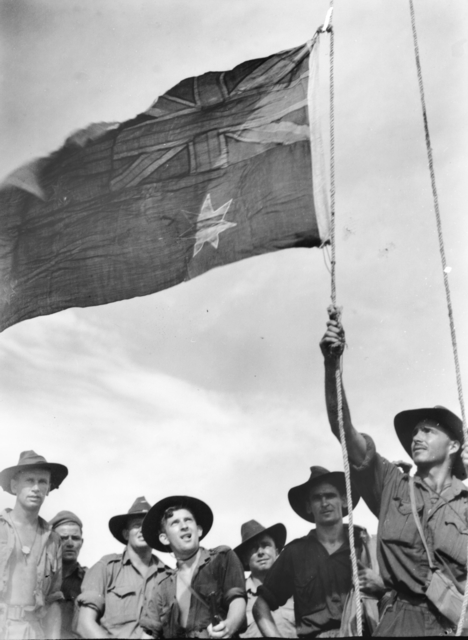
Members of the Australian 2/4th Cavalry Commando Squadron raise the Australian flag over Sadau Island on 30 April 1945

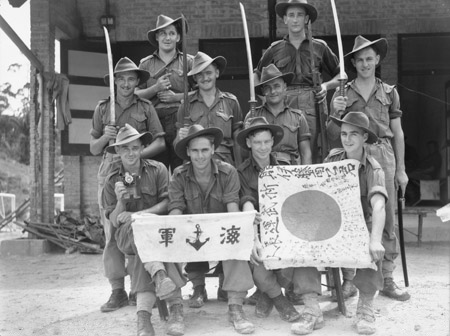
Members of the 2/24th Battalion pose with captured Japanese swords and flags in July 1945

The 26th Brigade Group remained on Tarakan as an occupation force until 27 December 1945, though most of its units were disbanded in October. The Brigade's headquarters returned to Australia in early 1946 and was formally disbanded at Brisbane in January 1946.

Tarakan's oilfields were swiftly repaired and brought back into production. Engineers and technicians arrived shortly after the Allied landing and the first oil pump was restored on 27 June. By October the island's oilfields were producing 8,000 barrels per day and providing employment for many Tarakanese civilians.

The Allied units committed to the battle carried out their tasks with "skill and professionalism". In summing up the operation Samuel Eliot Morison wrote that "altogether this was a very well conducted amphibious operation which attained its objectives with minimum loss". The Battle of Tarakan emphasised the importance of combined arms warfare, and especially the need for infantry to cooperate with and be supported by tanks, artillery and engineers during jungle warfare.

Despite Morison's judgement, the 26th Brigade Group's casualties were high in comparison to the other landings in the Borneo campaign. The Brigade suffered more than twice the casualties the 9th Division's other two Brigades suffered during their operations in North Borneo and 23 more fatalities than the 7th Division incurred at Balikpapan. The 26th Brigade Group's higher losses may be attributable to Tarakan's garrison not being able to withdraw as the garrisons in North Borneo and Balikpapan did.

The landing force's achievements were nullified by the fact that the island's airfield could not be brought into action. The faulty intelligence assessment which led the RAAF planners to believe that the airfield could be repaired represented a major failing. Moreover, the RAAF's performance at Tarakan was often poor. This performance may have resulted from the low morale prevalent in many units and the 'Morotai Mutiny' disrupting 1 TAF's leadership.

As with the rest of the Borneo campaign, the Australian operations on Tarakan remain controversial. Debate continues over whether the campaign was a meaningless "sideshow", or whether it was justified in the context of the planned operations to both invade Japan and liberate the rest of the Netherlands East Indies, which were both scheduled to begin in 1946. The Australian official historian Gavin Long's judgement that "the results achieved did not justify the cost of the Tarakan operation" is in accordance with the generally held view on the battle.

== See also ==
- Naval Base Borneo
- Western New Guinea campaign
- US Naval Advance Bases
