= 2/3rd Pioneer Battalion =

Assault pioneer battalion of the Australian Army

- Active: 1940–1946
- Country: Australia
- Branch: Australian Army
- Role: Pioneer
- Part of: 9th Division
- Engagements: World War II: North African campaign; Salamaua–Lae campaign; Huon Peninsula campaign; Borneo campaign

Insignia
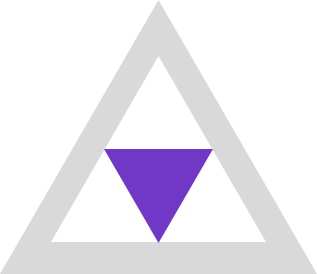
- Unit colour patch

The 2/3rd Pioneer Battalion was a pioneer battalion of the Australian Army, which served during World War II. Formed in 1940, the battalion served in the Middle East where it fought in Syria and Palestine before taking part in the fighting around El Alamein. In 1943, the battalion returned to Australia and subsequently took part in the fighting against the Japanese in New Guinea in 1943–1944. Their final campaign came in mid-1945, when they took part in the Battle of Tarakan during the Borneo campaign. The battalion was disbanded in early 1946.

== History ==
The 2/3rd Pioneer Battalion was raised for service during World War II as part of the Second Australian Imperial Force (2nd AIF) in May 1940 and drew the majority of its initial intake of personnel from Sydney. The concept of pioneer battalions had originally been explored by the Australians during World War I, when five such battalions were formed and used as support troops assigned at divisional level on the Western Front. Notionally organised along a traditional infantry structure, pioneer battalions consisted of a headquarters and four companies, and were expected to serve to undertake minor engineering tasks during combat to free up trained engineers for more complex tasks. Four such units were raised during World War II to provide engineer support to the 2nd AIF's four infantry divisions, and within the divisional structure, the pioneers were administered as corps troops under the direction of the divisional engineer commander.

After undertaking training in various locations in New South Wales, in March 1941 the battalion was moved to Darwin, Northern Territory, to undertake garrison duties. At that time they were assigned to the 7th Division and they remained in the north of Australia until September when they were transported to Sydney. Two months later they embarked on the Queen Mary, bound for the Middle East.

They disembarked in Egypt in November and after spending some time in Palestine, they were sent to Syria to undertake garrison duties following the completion of the campaign against the Vichy French forces there. Following this, the battalion was transferred to the 9th Division after the decision was made to bring the 7th Division back to Australia in early 1942 in response to Japan's entry into the war. In July 1942, the 9th Division was moved from Syria to Egypt and between August and November, the 2/3rd Pioneer Battalion took part in the fighting around El Alamein, temporarily being assigned to the 24th Brigade when the 2/28th Battalion was virtually destroyed following an unsuccessful attack on Ruin Ridge.

In early 1943, the battalion returned to Australia as the 9th Division was brought back from the Middle East to deal with the threat posed by Japan's entry into the war. After this, training was undertaken on the Atherton Tablelands in Queensland before the 2/3rd were committed to the fighting in the New Guinea campaign around Lae in September 1943. The battalion's main involvement in the campaign was to carry out manual tasks such as unloading and carrying stores. Later, during the Huon Peninsula campaign, they landed at Scarlet Beach, north of Finschhafen, where they served in a defensive role and helped to turn back a Japanese counter-attack before undertaking various construction tasks around Sattelberg.

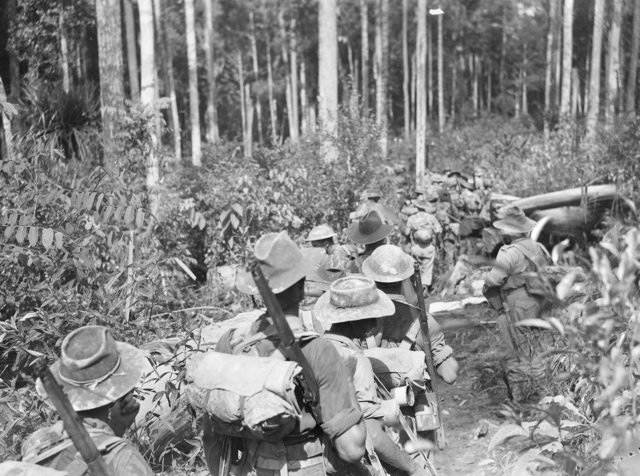
Soldiers from the 2/3rd Pioneer Battalion's D Company moving along a track on Tarakan

In March 1944, the battalion was withdrawn back to Australia for rest and reorganisation. They subsequently spent over a year training in Queensland before taking part in the fighting on Tarakan during the Borneo campaign in mid-1945, under the command of Lieutenant Colonel John Anderson. During the landing on Sadau, in the Balagau Strait, the battalion's personnel manned machine-guns on the landing craft that brought the Australians ashore. Following this, the 2/3rd Pioneer Battalion undertook engineering tasks around the beachhead. As the Australians advanced along the Anzac Highway towards the Japanese airfield, the battalion was withdrawn from construction tasks and put into the line as infantry. On 4 May, they were assigned to support the 26th Brigade and after relieving the 2/23rd Battalion, they commenced patrolling operations around the Tarakan town and the adjacent oilfields. The following day they launched an attack against Japanese positions located on two hills dubbed "Helen" and "Sadie" by the Australians. By 14 May, with artillery and air support, these positions were captured and two days elements of the battalion were able to advance through the Japanese lines, reaching the mouth of the Amal River on the coast. It was during the fighting on "Helen" in early May that one of the battalion's soldiers, Corporal Jack Mackey, performed the deeds that resulted in him being posthumously awarded the Victoria Cross.

The fighting on Tarakan came to an end in mid-June when organised Japanese resistance was overcome. Small pockets of Japanese troops remained at large, however, and so mopping up operations were undertaken throughout June and into July until these groups began to surrender due to their increasingly desperate shortage of food. During this time, the 2/3rd Pioneer Battalion conducted barge patrols between Tarakan and the neighbouring islands, as well as undertaking foot patrols in the south of the island.

On 15 August, following the atomic bombings of Hiroshima and Nagasaki, the Japanese surrendered and the war came to an end. Upon the completion of hostilities, the demobilisation process, which had begun to a limited extent in July, gained impetus. As a part of this, individual personnel were repatriated back to Australia, or transferred to other units for subsequent service, however the battalion remained in Borneo, undertaking garrison duties, and did not return to Australia until January 1946, when they were subsequently disbanded. Throughout the course of its service the 2/3rd Pioneer Battalion lost 97 men killed in action or died of wounds or on active service. A further 262 men were wounded. Members of the battalion received the following decorations: one Victoria Cross, two Military Crosses, one Distinguished Conduct Medal, five Military Medals and 22 Mentions in Despatches.

After the war, the functions of the pioneers were subsumed into traditional infantry battalions, which each raised a platoon of assault pioneers within their support companies. As a result, no pioneer battalions have been re-raised in the Australian Army since the end of World War II.

== Battle honours ==
The 2/3rd Pioneer Battalion received the following battle honours:

- Capture of Lae, North Africa 1942, El Alamein, South-West Pacific 1943–45, Finschhafen, Defence of Scarlet Beach, Siki Cove, Borneo, Tarakan.

== Commanding officers ==
The following officers served as commanding officer of the 2/3rd Pioneer Battalion:

- John Alexander Anderson,
- Alfred Victor Gallasch,
- William Charles Douglas Veale.
