= Jack Mackey =

Recipient of the Victoria Cross

John Bernard Mackey VC
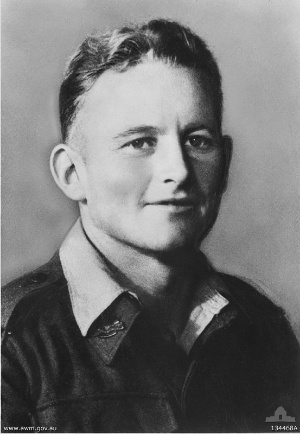
- John Mackey
- Born: 16 May 1922; Leichhardt, Australia
- Died: 12 May 1945 (aged 22); Tarakan, Japanese-occupied Dutch East Indies
- Burial place: Labuan War Cemetery
- Military career
- Allegiance: Australia
- Branch: Second Australian Imperial Force
- Service years: 1940–45
- Rank: Corporal
- Units: 2/3rd Pioneer Battalion
- Conflicts: Second World War; Syria–Lebanon Campaign; North African Campaign; Second Battle of El Alamein; Pacific War; New Guinea Campaign; Borneo Campaign; Battle of Tarakan †
- Awards: Victoria Cross

John Bernard Mackey, VC (16 May 1922 – 12 May 1945) was an Australian recipient of the Victoria Cross, the highest award for gallantry in the face of the enemy that can be awarded to British Commonwealth forces. Mackey was one of twenty Australians to receive the award for actions during the Second World War, receiving his award posthumously for leading an attack on against a strongly defended Japanese position during the Battle of Tarakan in May 1945. He was 22 and serving as a corporal in the 2/3rd Pioneer Battalion at the time of his death.

== Early life ==
Born in Leichhardt, New South Wales, Mackey was the only son and the eldest of four children of Stanislaus Mackey, a baker, and his wife Bridget Catherine Smyth Mackey. After attending St. Columba's School in Leichhardt and the Christian Brothers' High School in Lewisham, New South Wales, the Mackey family moved to Portland, New South Wales, in 1936, where his father operated a bakery. Mackey finished his schooling at the age of 14 and began working for his father as a baker. However, he did not enjoy the work and his relationship with his father deteriorated.

== Second World War ==
On 5 June 1940, Mackey enlisted in the Second Australian Imperial Force, falsifying his age to do so. After training, he was posted to the 2/3rd Pioneer Battalion and left with the unit in November 1941 for service in North Africa. He participated in the Syrian Campaign against the Vichy French and in the Second Battle of El Alamein.

The Japanese threat to Australia grew as they advanced through the Pacific in 1942. In response, the Australian government requested the withdrawal of Australian units back to their home country, and Mackey's battalion returned in February 1943. It served in Papua New Guinea from August 1943 to March 1944, during which time Mackey was promoted to the rank of corporal. While in Papua, he suffered several bouts of malaria. After a period of rest and reorganisation in Australia, the battalion returned to the Southwest Pacific theatre of operations in April 1945 when they were committed to the Borneo Campaign.

On 1 May 1945, Mackey's battalion, as part of 26th Brigade Group, landed at Lingkas Beach on Tarakan Island, off North Borneo. The island's airfield was to be captured to allow its use in operations against Borneo. Advancing inland along the Aman River, the battalion were held up by Japanese defending a stronghold known as Helen. On 12 May 1945, Mackey's company was to continue an attack that had begun three days previously and it was during this action that he earned the Victoria Cross (VC). The citation for his VC read:

Corporal Mackey was in charge of a section of the 2/3rd Australian Pioneer Battalion in the attack on the feature known as Helen, east of Tarakan town. Led by Corporal Mackey the section moved along a narrow spur with scarcely width for more than one man when it came under fire from three well-sited positions near the top of a very steep, razor-backed ridge. The ground fell away almost sheer on each side of the track making it almost impossible to move to a flank so Corporal Mackey led his men forward. He charged the first Light Machine-Gun position but slipped and after wrestling with one enemy, bayoneted him, and charged straight on to the Heavy Machine-Gun which was firing from a bunker position six yards to his right. He rushed this post and killed the crew with grenades. He then jumped back and changing his rifle for a sub-machine-gun he attacked further up the steep slope another Light Machine-Gun position which was firing on his platoon. Whilst charging, he fired his gun and reached with a few feet of the enemy position when he was killed by Light Machine-Gun fire but not before he had killed two more enemy. By his exceptional bravery and complete disregard for his own life, Corporal Mackey was largely responsible for the killing of seven Japanese and the elimination of two machine-gun posts, which enabled his platoon to gain its objective, from which the Company continued to engage the enemy. His fearless action and outstanding courage were an inspiration to the whole battalion.

The Japanese continued to hold off the attacking pioneers for a further two days before Helen was bombed with napalm, forcing them to abandon the position. Originally buried where he was killed, after the war Mackey was interred at Labuan War Cemetery. Mackey's VC was presented to his sister, Patricia, and was later donated to the Australian War Memorial, where it is now on display in the Hall of Valour.
