= 2/23rd Battalion (Australia) =

Infantry battalion of the Australian Army

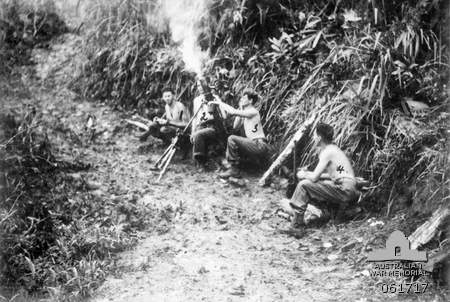
- Mortars from the 2/23rd fire in support of the battalion's advance during the Huon Peninsula campaign, December 1943
- Active: 1940–1946
- Country: Australia
- Branch: Australian Army
- Type: Infantry
- Size: ~800–900 personnel (Note: By the start of World War II, the authorised strength of an Australian infantry battalion was 910 men all ranks; however, later in the war it fell to 803.)
- Part of: 26th Brigade, 7th Division; 26th Brigade, 9th Division
- Nickname: "Albury's Own"
- Engagements: Second World War: Siege of Tobruk; First Battle of El Alamein; Second Battle of El Alamein; Huon Peninsula campaign; Borneo Campaign

Insignia
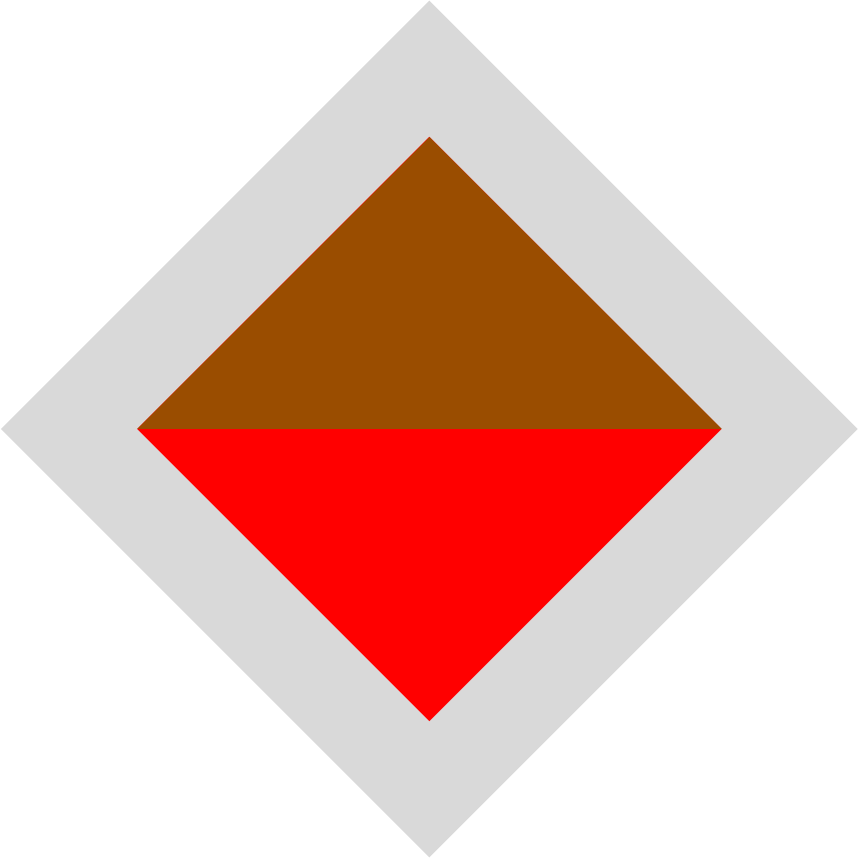
- Unit colour patch (1940–42)

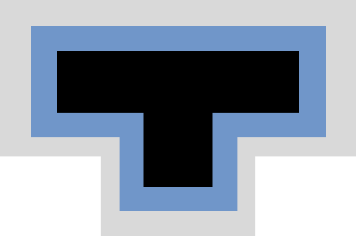
- (1942–46)

The 2/23rd Battalion was an infantry battalion of the Australian Army, which served during the Second World War. Formed in June 1940 from primarily volunteers from Albury, New South Wales, the battalion served in North Africa in 1941–1942 as part of the 26th Brigade, which was assigned to the 7th Division, before being reassigned to the 9th Division. In early 1943, the battalion returned to Australia and later took part in campaigns against the Japanese in New Guinea in 1943–1944 and Borneo in 1945, before being disbanded in 1946.

== History ==
=== Formation and establishment ===
Established at Victoria Barracks, in Melbourne, in June 1940, the 2/23rd Battalion was raised as part of the all volunteer Second Australian Imperial Force and assigned to the 26th Brigade. Under the command of Lieutenant Colonel Bernard Evans, a small cadre of experienced personnel drawn from Victorian Militia units were concentrated at Victoria Barracks prior to the battalion headquarters being relocated to Albury, New South Wales, where a large number of volunteers were completing their recruit training at the 4th Recruit Training Battalion. Upon the conclusion of this course, these recruits were posted to the 2/23rd and the battalion – over 900 strong – moved to Bonegilla, Victoria, just across the border, where more complex collective training was completed prior to departure overseas. A large majority of the battalion's initial intake of volunteers came from the Albury–Wodonga region and as a result, the 2/23rd became known as "Albury's Own". Upon formation, the battalion consisted of a headquarters company consisting of various specialist platoons, and four rifle companies.

The colours initially chosen for the battalion's unit colour patch (UCP) were the same as those of the 23rd Battalion, a unit which had served during the First World War before being raised as a Militia formation in 1921. These colours were brown over red, in a diamond shape, although a border of gray was added to the UCP to distinguish the battalion from its Militia counterpart; this was later changed, though, following the unit's involvement in the fighting at Tobruk, when it adopted a T-shaped UCP.

=== Middle East ===
Embarking in November 1940 on the transport Strathmore at Port Melbourne, the 2/23rd arrived in Egypt in mid-December. The battalion's parent brigade was reassigned from the 7th Division to the 9th in early 1941 and just after this, the 2/23rd was sent to Cyrenica, in Libya. A German–Italian offensive from the west, resulted in the withdrawal of British Commonwealth forces back to the vital port of Tobruk. Over the course of eight months starting from early April, the 2/23rd formed part of the garrison during the Siege of Tobruk, during which they took part in defensive actions and counter-attacks as they were moved around the perimeter; casualties were heavy, with over 200 personnel being killed, wounded or captured.

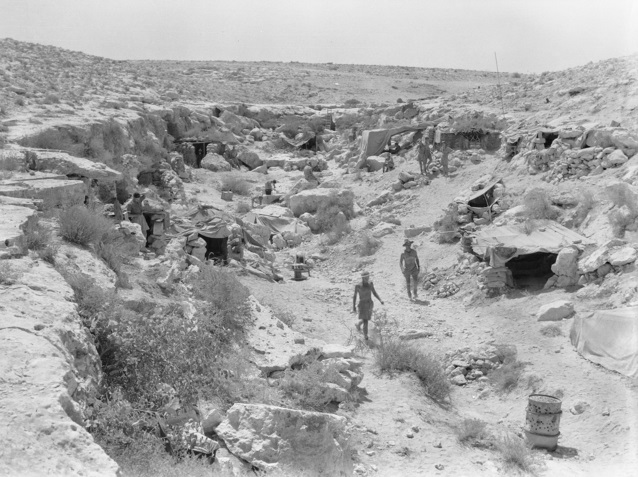
2/23rd positions in Libya, August 1941

The battalion was withdrawn from Tobruk in October 1941 when they were relieved by Polish troops. A period of reorganisation in Palestine followed before the 2/23rd was sent to Syria in January 1942 to undertake garrison duties. This came to an end in June 1942, when the 9th Division was hurriedly moved to Egypt to help bolster Allied forces fighting around El Alamein. The 2/23rd subsequently took part in both the First and Second Battles of El Alamein; its most significant actions came around Tel el Eisa with the battalion launching two main attacks, one on the ridge in July and another to secure a road to the west of the ridge in October. Both attacks resulted in heavy casualties, with the battalion's losses being around 400 in total; nevertheless, both resulted in some tactical gains before the battalion was withdrawn on 1 November 1942, when the 24th Brigade relieved the 26th. Lieutenant Colonel Reg Wall took over command of the battalion at this time, after Evans was promoted to brigadier to take over the 24th Brigade.

A period of rest followed, and following a request by the Australian government to return the 9th Division to Australia to join the other two divisions that had been redeployed from the Middle East – the 6th and 7th – the 2/23rd began the journey back to Australia. Staging out of Palestine, they sailed upon the Nieuw Amsterdam, reaching Fremantle, Western Australia, on 18 February before proceeding on to Sydney, which was reached on the 25th.

=== New Guinea and Borneo ===
The battalion's personnel concentrated at Seymour, Victoria, after taking leave, and the 2/23rd subsequently began a period of training and re-organisation as it was converted to the jungle division establishment. This resulted in the issue of new equipment, and a decrease in the battalion's authorised strength and number of vehicles. (Note: See Palazzo 2004 for more information about the conversion of Australian Army units for jungle warfare.) Training was completed on the Atherton Tablelands in Queensland, before the battalion moved to Milne Bay, in New Guinea, in August 1943. The following month, on 4 September, they took part in an amphibious landing to capture Lae, during which one of the landing craft the battalion headquarters was travelling in was bombed by a Japanese aircraft, killing the battalion's commanding officer of the time, Lieutenant Colonel Reg Wall. Major Eric McRae assumed temporary command of the battalion until Lieutenant Colonel Frederick Tucker arrived in October. The 2/23rd subsequently took part in a brief advance along the coast driving on Lae from the east through the jungle, with the battalion crossing several rivers along the way. Several minor skirmishes took place during the advance, although the most significant action was fought on the second day of the operation between an isolated platoon and the remnants of a Japanese company, during which the Japanese force was largely destroyed.

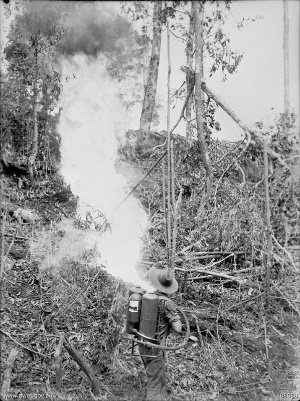
A soldier from the 2/23rd with a flamethrower during fighting on Tarakan, 1 June 1945.

Lae fell in mid-September, more quickly than the Allies had expected, as troops from the 7th Division entered the town from the west, but a large part of the Japanese garrison managed to escape inland towards the Huon Peninsula. Shortly afterwards, the 2/23rd took part in a second amphibious landing north of Finschhafen, at a beach designated "Scarlet Beach" by the Allies. Between 22 September and 9 December, the 2/23rd took part in the Huon Peninsula campaign, taking part in significant actions around Sattelberg and Wareo as the Australians advanced inland. Early in 1944, the battalion took part in the advance to Sio as the withdrawing Japanese were pursued north. Their involvement was limited mainly to patrol actions, and no significant battles were fought before the 9th Division was withdrawn from New Guinea and transported back to Australia for rest in February 1944.

For the next year, the battalion was based around Ravenshoe, Queensland, where it was almost completely rebuilt. Strategic uncertainties and the changing war situation meant that it was not committed to a further campaign until very late in the war, when the 9th Division was assigned to Operation Oboe. Within this plan, the 26th Brigade was tasked with capturing Tarakan as part of the Borneo campaign. A preliminary move was made to Morotai Island in April and the following month, the attack was launched. The 2/23rd was assigned a lead role in the initial landing, and after negotiating the muddy landing beach fought its way into Tarakan town. Several actions were fought throughout the day as they came up against Japanese pill-boxes and snipers, but by the end of the first day, the 2/23rd had secured all but one of its initial objectives. The 2/23rd fought several actions to help secure the high ground around the beachhead before moving on to help secure the airfield. Throughout May and June, the fighting continued as the Australians advanced into the steep inland areas of the island. By the middle of June, the fighting had mainly subsided and the battalion began mopping up operations in the central sector of the island, conducting patrols looking for stragglers until July during which clashes continued to occur.

The fighting came to an end in August 1945 following the dropping of the atomic bombs on Nagasaki and Hiroshima and afterwards the 2/23rd was slowly reduced in size as personnel were sent back to Australia for demobilisation or posting. In early December, the remaining members were transported back to Australia on the Stamford Victory and on 17 February 1946, the 2/23rd was disbanded at Puckapunyal, Victoria. Over 3,000 personnel served in the battalion during the war, and casualties amounted to 320 dead from all causes and 773 wounded. (Note: Morgan provides different figures: 244 killed in action, 52 died of wounds, three died from accidents, as well as 766 wounded and 103 prisoners of war.)

== Battle honours ==
The 2/23rd Battalion received the following battle honours:

- North Africa 1941–42, Defence of Tobruk, The Salient 1941, Defence of Alamein Line, El Alamein, South-West Pacific 1943–45, Lae-Nadzab, Finschhafen, Borneo, Busu River, Sattelberg, Wareo and Tarakan.

== Commanding officers ==
The following officers served as commanding officer of the 2/23rd:

- Lieutenant Colonel Bernard Evans (1940–1942);
- Lieutenant Colonel Reginald Wall (1942–1943);
- Major Eric McRae (1943); and
- Lieutenant Colonel Frederick Tucker (1943–1945)

== Tarakan flag ==
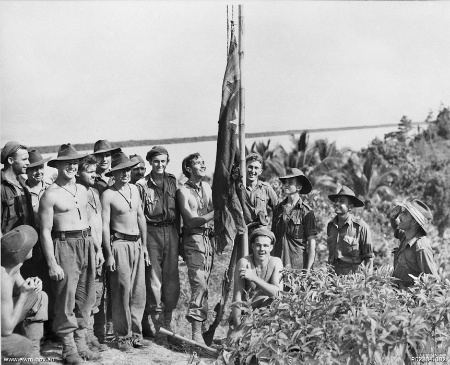
The Australian flag raised at Sadau Island, Tarakan, 30 April 1945.

In 2018, the Australian Flag Society announced the discovery of an Australian flag believed to have used by the 2/23rd Battalion and flown at Lingkas during the invasion of Tarakan. A photographed believed to have been of this event, has in recent years been reidentified as a flag being raised on Sadau Island, Tarakan by the 2/4 Commando Squadron, based on other photographs of this event.

== Notes ==
Footnotes

Citations
