= Jungle division =

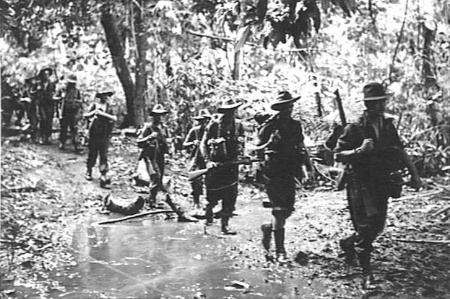
Australian troops of B Company, 30th Battalion crossing a shallow creek between Weber Point and Malalamai during the Battle of Sio in 1944.

The Jungle division was a military organisation adopted in early 1943 by the Australian Army during the Second World War. This organisation was a much lighter version of the standard British-pattern infantry division used during previous campaigns in the deserts of the Mediterranean and Middle East Theatre fighting the Germans and Italians in 1940 and 1941 and was optimised to meet the needs of jungle warfare against the Japanese in the South West Pacific Area. Jungle divisions were smaller and had fewer heavy weapons, vehicles and support units than the British-pattern division previously used and had an establishment of just 13,118 men, approximately 4,000 fewer than a standard division. The bulk of the reduction occurred among the administrative, transport and artillery units. The conditions that prevailed in the South West Pacific Area led the Australian Army to initially convert five infantry divisions to Jungle divisions, although this was later increased to six. Divisions converted to the jungle organisation included three Militia divisions: the 3rd, 5th and 11th and the three Australian Imperial Force (AIF) divisions: the 6th, 7th, 9th. Despite some modifications, this re-organisation proved successful during later Australian operations in New Guinea, New Britain, Bougainville, Aitape-Wewak and Borneo in 1944–1945.

== Reorganisation of the Australian Army, 1943 ==
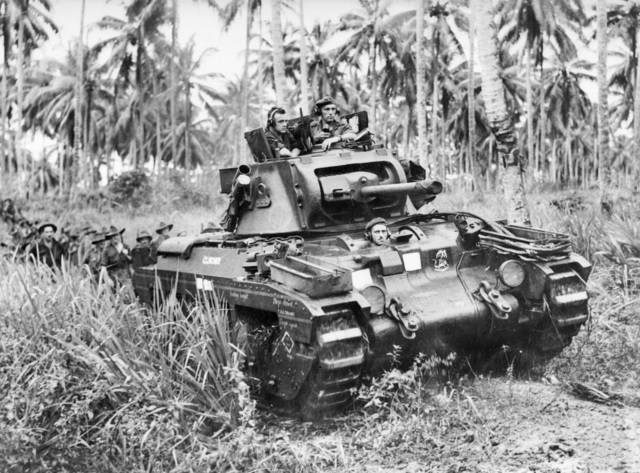
A Matilda tank from the Australian 4th Armoured Brigade, moves towards Japanese strong points near Finschhafen, on 9 November 1943.

The changing nature of land warfare during the Second World War led to significant changes in the composition of Australian Army units. The success of German mechanised units during the invasions of Poland and France convinced Australian defence planners that the Army required armoured units, and these began to be raised in 1941 when the 1st Armoured Division was formed. The two Militia cavalry divisions were first motorised and then converted into armoured divisions in 1942 and the 3rd Army Tank Brigade was formed to provide support to the infantry. However, in response to the growing Japanese threat Australian forces were concentrated in the South West Pacific Area and between 1942 and early 1943 the divisions of the Australian Imperial Force (AIF) had fought using the standard British Army organisation they had adopted during previous campaigns in the deserts of North Africa and the Middle East fighting the Germans and Italians in 1940 and 1941, while the Militia divisions used a 1941 Australian organisation which included a headquarters company, four rifle companies and a machine-gun company in each infantry battalion. Yet the early campaigns suggested that the existing organisation was unsuitable for jungle warfare and as a result of the changing operational environment in February 1943 Land Headquarters identified the need for three different types of division: armoured divisions, standard infantry divisions and jungle infantry divisions.

The jungle division organisation operated on reduced manpower and had fewer heavy weapons, vehicles and support units than the British-pattern division previously used, with the main imperatives being "manpower, transport, and communications." As many administrative personnel as possible were also removed from the divisional structure, while fewer vehicles also meant a reduced requirement for maintenance personnel and reduced logistical support. Each battalion was reduced in size and placed on a new "tropical war establishment", the anti-aircraft and carrier platoons were disbanded, and the latter converted into a medium machine-gun platoon of four Vickers machine-guns, while the number of 3-inch mortars was increased from six to eight. Equally while the standard division contained a large number of motorbikes, trucks and mechanised vehicles, such transport was of limited use in the rugged, roadless jungles and the muddy tracks of the South West Pacific. To this end each rifle company was restricted to just one jeep and trailer, relying instead on "foot mobility" and supported logistically by native carriers rather than vehicles, as well as by air transport and supply dropping. In addition to reducing the number of vehicles, most trucks were replaced by light vehicles, as these were able to more effectively traverse narrow tracks in difficult terrain, and could be manhandled across mud, soft sand and creeks if required. Following the reorganisation each infantry battalion consisted of a battalion headquarters, four rifle companies each of three platoons, and a headquarters company consisting of signals, machine-gun, mortar, anti-tank, pioneer and administration platoons. It had an establishment of between 800 and 850 men. (Note: The establishment of a standard infantry battalion was 35 officers and 875 other ranks. Under the jungle organisation each battalion was reduced by 1 officer and 106 other ranks, see Grey 2001, p. 149)

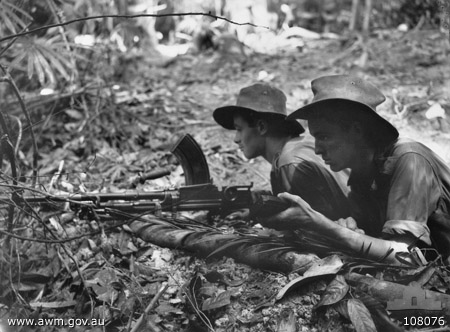
Soldiers from the 2/23rd Battalion during the attack on Freda feature on Tarakan 1945.

The rationale behind these changes was to increase the effectiveness of infantry units by stripping them of elements which were not necessary in tropical terrain or those that were no longer required due to declining Japanese airpower and artillery. Equally it served to reduce the size of the Australian Army in order to free up manpower for civilian industry in the face of a growing manpower crisis as the wartime economy expanded. Indeed, a jungle division had an establishment of just 13,118 men, approximately 4,000 fewer than a standard division. The bulk of the reduction occurred among the administrative, transport and artillery units. In particular the nature of the fighting in the Middle East meant that the standard three field artillery regiments attached to each division had been essential; however, the difficulty of transporting guns and maintaining adequate ammunition supply in the Pacific led to a significant reduction in artillery, with only one field regiment per division considered viable. The greatest problem faced in New Guinea was logistical support as the island lacked roads and port facilities, while its terrain was amongst the most difficult in the world. Inland the main means of movement was on foot, and native porters were essential for the transport of supplies and the evacuation of the wounded. The jungle division optimised the Army for operations in that environment. Meanwhile, the armoured division and those infantry divisions defending Australia would maintain their existing order of battle.

The conditions that prevailed in the South West Pacific Area in early 1943 led the Australian Army to initially convert five infantry divisions to Jungle divisions, although this was later increased to six. Divisions converted to the jungle organisation included three Militia divisions: the 3rd, 5th and 11th and the three AIF divisions: the 6th, 7th, 9th. These divisions formed the bulk of Australia's deployed forces, with the remaining divisions predominantly used for home service where the open terrain suited them, while others were disbanded. Large armoured units were especially unsuitable for jungle warfare, and most were reduced or disbanded during 1943 and 1944. (Note: The 10th Division had been disbanded in 1942; the 1st Armoured, 2nd Armoured and 3rd Armoured Divisions were disbanded in 1943, although a number of independent tank brigades remained. The 2nd and 4th Divisions were disbanded in 1944. The 1st Division (a training formation) and the 12th Division (Northern Territory Force) were reduced to one brigade each in 1945. See Grey 2001, p. 150, Long 1973, pp. 293–295 and Palazzo 2001, pp. 178–183.) Yet this organisation proved only moderately successful, largely because the conditions that it was designed for did not recur. Experience later demonstrated that additional artillery support was required and a number of divisions—including the 7th and 9th—were subsequently assigned an additional two field artillery regiments. As a result, the divisions were strengthened by returning the artillery and anti-tank units which had been removed. Regardless, although the jungle divisions still had less firepower than the standard division they proved better suited for the projection of power in the tropics. Despite some modifications, this re-organisation proved successful during later Australian operations in New Guinea, New Britain, Bougainville, Aitape-Wewak and Borneo in 1944–1945.

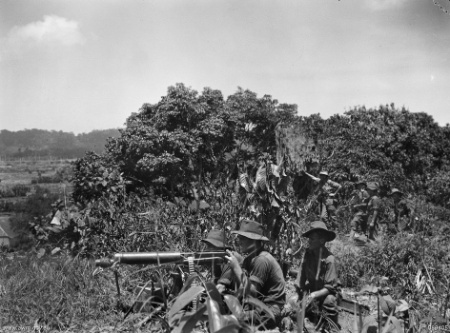
Vickers medium machine-gun supporting D Company, 2/23rd Battalion during the fighting for Tarakan Hill, 2 May 1945.

The creation of the jungle divisions proved significant for the Australian Army in that it represented the first time in its history it had adopted an organisation specifically for the conditions in which the bulk of its forces would fight, rather than just following accepted British doctrine. Previously force structure had been heavily influenced by the British Army, and the decision to adopt an organisation to suit local conditions reflected a growing maturity and independence from the imperial authorities in London. Yet it also resulted in the adoption of a two-tier force structure, with formations not designated for jungle warfare remaining on the previous scales of equipment and manning. Ultimately, while this meant that their structure was better suited to operations in Australia, they were no longer able to be used against the Japanese. As a result, the burden of the fighting increasingly fell on those formations that had been re-organised, while the remainder of the Army was relegated to garrison duties. This had largely been inevitable due to the limited manpower available though, and the Army had been forced to concentrate its offensive power in the jungle divisions, while the forces remaining in Australia were manned by troops not fit for service overseas.

== Order of battle ==
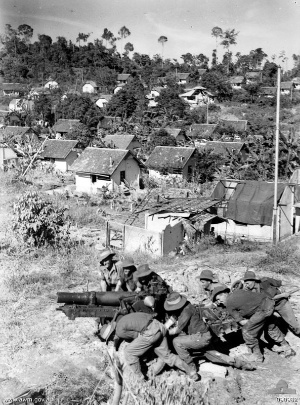
A 2/7th Field Regiment gun crew move a Short 25 Pounder on Tarakan, 2 May 1945.

The main units in each Jungle division upon their formation in 1943 were as follows: (Note: Additional units, such as machine-gun battalions, commando squadrons and armoured regiments were also available at corps level, and were assigned to divisions as required.)

- Divisional Headquarters
- 3 x Infantry Brigades (each of three Infantry Battalions for a total of nine)
- 1 x Field Artillery Regiment (equipped with twenty-four 25 Pounder guns)
- 1 x Light Anti-Aircraft Battery
- Divisional Provost Company (Military Police)
- Divisional Carrier Company (equipped with Bren Carriers)
- Divisional Signals
- Divisional Engineers
  - 1 x Field Park Company
  - 3 x Field Companies
  - Camouflage Training Unit
- Divisional Supply and Transport
  - Supply Depot Company
  - General Transport Company
- 3 x Field Ambulance Companies
- 6 x Light Aid Detachments
- 3 x Brigade workshops

== Notes ==
Footnotes

Citations
