= Battle of North Borneo =

1945 battle of World War II

- Part of Pacific theatre of the Second World War
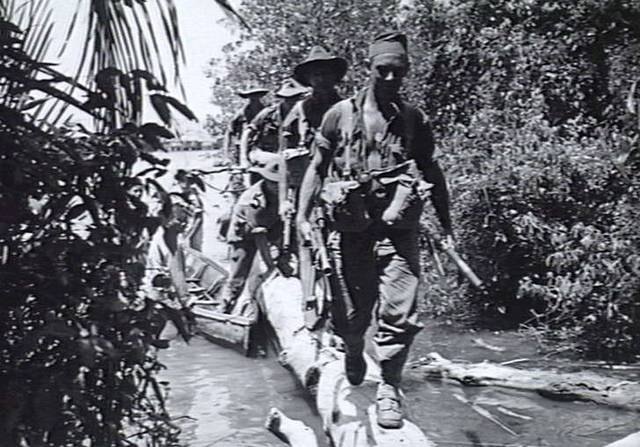
- Members of a patrol from 'A' Company, Australian 2/43rd Battalion, disembark from a boat and walk along a large fallen tree, as they move inland to investigate reports of Japanese activity.
Date	10 June – 15 August 1945
Location	North Borneo (present-day Sabah and Brunei)
Result	Allied victory

Belligerents
Australia; United States	Japan

Commanders and leaders
(Australia) George Wootten (Australia) Selwyn Porter (Australia) Victor Windeyer	(Empire of Japan) Baba Masao (Empire of Japan) Taijiro Akashi

Units involved
(Australia) 9th Division; 20th Brigades; 24th Brigades; (United States) 727th Amphibian Tractor Battalion; (United States) 593rd Engineer Boat and Shore Regiment; British North Borneo Constabulary	(Empire of Japan) Thirty-Seventh Army; 56th Mixed Brigade

Strength
≈29,000–30,000 men	≈8,800 men (Allied estimate)

Casualties and losses
114 killed or died of wounds 221 wounded	At least 1,234 killed 130 captured

The Battle of North Borneo took place during the Second World War between Allied and Japanese forces. Part of the wider Borneo campaign of the Pacific War, it was fought between 10 June and 15 August 1945 in North Borneo (later known as Sabah). The battle involved a series of amphibious landings by Australian forces on various points on the mainland around Brunei Bay and upon islands situated around the bay. Japanese opposition to the landings was sporadic initially, although as the campaign progressed a number of considerable clashes occurred and both sides suffered significant casualties, although major combat was largely restricted to Labuan and around Beaufort. On the mainland, while Allied conventional operations focused largely on the coastal areas around Brunei Bay, guerrilla forces consisting of Dayak tribesmen and small numbers of Allied personnel from the Services Reconnaissance Department fought an unconventional campaign in the interior. The Allies were successful in seizing control of the region. Nevertheless, many of the strategic gains that possession of North Borneo provided were ultimately negated by the sudden conclusion of the war in August 1945.

== Background ==
=== Strategic situation and planning ===
Codenamed Operation Oboe Six, the battle was part of the second phase of the Allied operations to capture the island of Borneo. North Borneo had been occupied by troops from the Imperial Japanese Army since early 1942 following the Japanese invasion of Borneo; prior to this the area had been a British territorial possession. Following its occupation, the area's oil resources had been exploited for the Japanese war effort. The island's population had also been subjected to harsh occupation policies. This had led to a revolt at Jesselton in late 1943, which was suppressed by the Japanese with heavy civilian casualties.

The first stage of the Allied campaign in Borneo had begun in May 1945 when a brigade-sized force had been put ashore on Tarakan, on the north-eastern side of Borneo. The operation in North Borneo was planned by General Douglas MacArthur's South West Pacific Area command. Designed with three phases—preparatory bombardment, forced landings, and an advance—the objective of the Allied operation was to establish "an advanced fleet base" for the British Pacific Fleet in Brunei Bay, which offered the Allies a deep-water port, to enable subsequent naval operations. Further objectives included capturing the vast oil and rubber supplies available in the area and re-establishing British civil administration. It was also intended that Labuan would be secured to control the entrance to Brunei Bay, and would be developed as an airbase. In the planning phase of the operation, the Allied high commands differed in their opinions about the necessity of securing Brunei, with the British Chiefs of Staff Committee believing it would take too long to develop the area for it to be developed for it to be used in operations. They were also concerned that it would divert the British Pacific Fleet from the main theatre of operations off Japan and instead favoured establishing a fleet base in the Philippines. The United States Joint Chiefs of Staff, however, approved the operation believing that it could support future operations in south-east Asia.

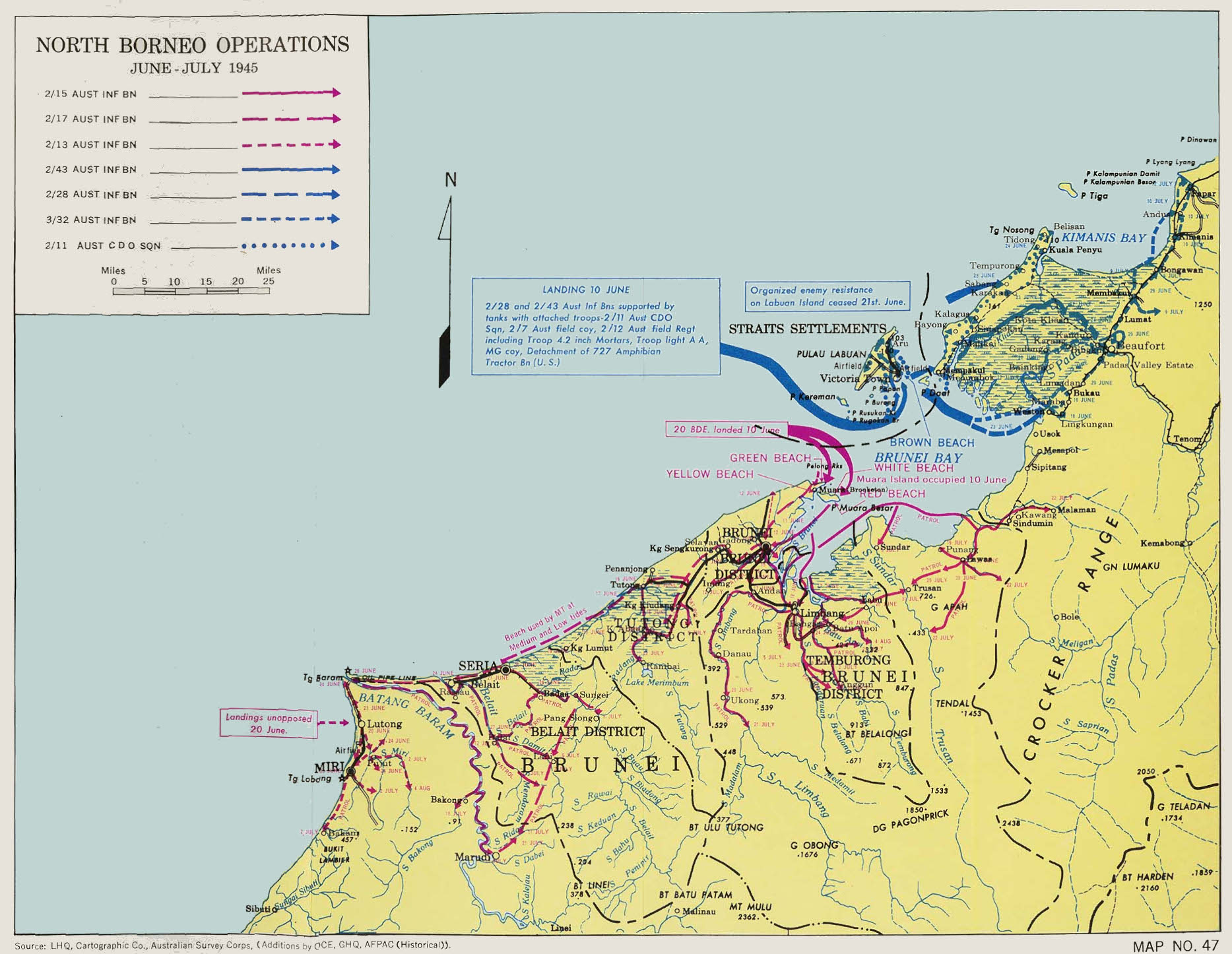
A map showing the movements of the main Australian infantry units in North Borneo

In preparation for the landings, commencing in March, the Allied Services Reconnaissance Department (also known as Special Operations Australia) began Operation Agas in North Borneo, and Operation Semut in Sarawak; these were clandestine operations to gather information and organise local Dayak tribesmen to carry out guerrilla operations following the main landings. Ultimately, five Allied parties would be inserted into Borneo as part of Operation Agas, while four were deployed under Semut. Preliminary aerial bombardment of northern Borneo by Australian and US aircraft began on 3 May, before being concentrated on the main landing areas on 5 June. Meanwhile, minesweepers began to clear sea lines of communication for the large Allied naval task force that was assigned to support the operation. This force was designated as Task Force 78.1 and consisted of Australian and US warships, under the command of Rear Admiral Forrest B. Royal. Initially, the Allies planned to launch operations in North Borneo in late May, but shipping shortages delayed moving the assault troops to their staging base on Morotai Island and resulted in the operation being delayed until early June.

=== Opposing forces ===
A total of 29,000–30,000 men were committed by the Allies to secure North Borneo, (Note: Odgers 1988, p. 183 provides the figure of 30,000 men, while Coulthard-Clark 1998, p. 252 provides the figure of 29,000. Long (1963), p. 459 provides the figure of 29,361 and breaks this down as: 14,079 men from the 9th Division; 3,726 corps support troops; 4,730 base sub-area troops, 5,729 Royal Australian Air Force personnel and 1,097 American and British personnel.) with the majority of the ground forces being provided by the Australian 9th Division, under the command of Major General George Wootten. The 9th Division consisted of three brigades—the 20th, 24th and 26th Brigades—however, at the time of the North Borneo operations, the 26th was engaged at Tarakan having been detached from the division in May 1945, so only two brigades were allocated to operations in North Borneo. Part of the all-volunteer Second Australian Imperial Force, the 9th Division was a veteran formation, having previously served in North Africa, the Middle East and New Guinea. Prior to the Borneo campaign, the division had been resting and reorganising on the Atherton Tablelands in Queensland. The division had experienced a high turn over in personnel following its service in the Huon Peninsula campaign as soldiers were medically discharged or transferred to other units. In addition to the Australian ground troops, naval support was provided by the United States Navy and Royal Australian Navy and aerial support from the United States Army Air Force's Thirteenth Air Force, the United States Marine Corps, and elements of the Royal Australian Air Force's 1st Tactical Air Force. Two United States Army units, the 727th Amphibian Tractor Battalion who manned the LVTs and the 593rd Engineer Boat and Shore Regiment's Boat Battalion, were also attached to the Australians.

Meanwhile, Allied intelligence estimated that there were approximately 31,000 Japanese troops on Borneo, with about 8,800 of these in North Borneo. The Japanese Thirty-Seventh Army, (Note: A Japanese "army" of World War II was equivalent to an Allied corps, and usually commanded between two and four divisions.) led by Lieutenant-General Masao Baba, was tasked with defending the area, and was headquartered in Jesselton. The main Japanese units in the vicinity included elements of the 56th Independent Mixed Brigade, consisting of six battalions (the 366th to the 371st), along with another independent battalion. This brigade was commanded by Major General Taijiro Akashi. It had been raised in Japan during the second half of 1944 and arrived in Borneo late that year as the area's garrison troops were reorganised for defence against future Allied landings. By mid-1945, the brigade had been heavily depleted by its overland movement from the north-eastern part of Borneo prior to the Allied landings and was at around half strength; its troops were largely inexperienced, lightly equipped and were suffering from poor morale. Japanese air power in the region had been heavily depleted and, except in Java and Sumatra, was ineffective, although there were small numbers of aircraft at Keningau and Kuching.

== Battle ==
=== Labuan ===
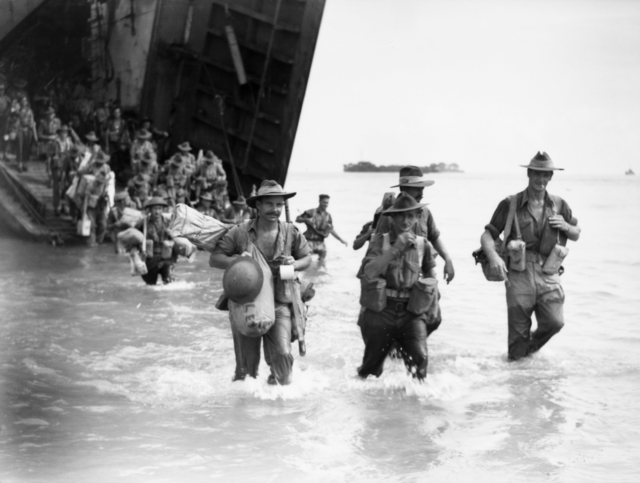
Australian troops from the 24th Brigade landing on Labuan on 10 June 1945.

Two main landings were undertaken by the Australians in North Borneo on 10 June. After concentrating at Morotai Island in May, where complex landing rehearsals were undertaken, the assault force, consisting of 85 ships—mainly from the US Navy—departed in early June, preceded by minesweepers and survey vessels, as well as the naval attack group. The first landing was made when troops from two battalions of Brigadier Selwyn Porter's 24th Brigade—the 2/28th and 2/43rd Battalions—landed on Labuan Island with a squadron of Matilda tanks from the 2/9th Armoured Regiment. The 24th Brigade's third battalion, 2/32nd Battalion, was placed in divisional reserve for the initial landing. The attack was preceded by a heavy naval bombardment from cruisers, mortar and rocket ships, and attacks by eight Liberator heavy bomber squadrons which used anti-personnel bombs to target Japanese troops around the intended beachheads. With this support, the main Allied landings were largely unopposed as the Japanese defenders had withdrawn from the beaches on the peninsula and Muara Island had been abandoned completely. At Labuan, the Australian troops came ashore near Victoria and, supported by a heavy artillery and naval gunfire support, the two battalions drove towards the airfield. Light opposition was overcome and the town and airfield were secured late on the first day, after minor clashes with Japanese outposts and troops fighting amongst the aircraft dispersal bays. Meanwhile, the 2/11th Commando Squadron provided flank support to the west.

Despite the initial progress the fighting on Labuan intensified during this time as the Japanese defenders retreated inland to a heavily fortified position known as "the Pocket" and attempted to hold the Australians along the dense jungle ridges and thick swamps. The 2/12th Commando Squadron was brought ashore from divisional reserve on 12 June and was given the task of clearing the outlying areas of resistance that had been bypassed during the initial advance on the island, By 14 June, the Australians had secured the island, apart from those Japanese contained within the Pocket. Despite considerable artillery and armoured support, a company-level attack by the 2/28th Battalion was turned back on 14 June, and as a result further preparatory fires were called upon to soften up the Japanese defences.

At this stage of the war, Australian commanders were under strict orders to limit their casualties, and "avoid unnecessary risks", utilising fire support where possible to reduce Japanese defences prior to attacking. Commencing on 17 June, an intense three day naval and aerial bombardment was laid down in an effort to reduce the Japanese defences. Meanwhile, 100 Japanese attacked the Australian brigade's maintenance area and the airfield before the Australians launch a renewed attack on 21 June. At this time, two companies of infantry from the 2/28th Battalion assaulted the Japanese position. Supported by indirect fire support from sea and air, and direct fire support from tanks and flamethrowers, the Australians overwhelmed the Japanese defenders and cleared the remaining resistance from Labuan. After the battle 180 Japanese dead were counted, bringing the total killed during the fighting on Labuan to 389. Against this the Australians suffered 34 killed and 93 wounded.

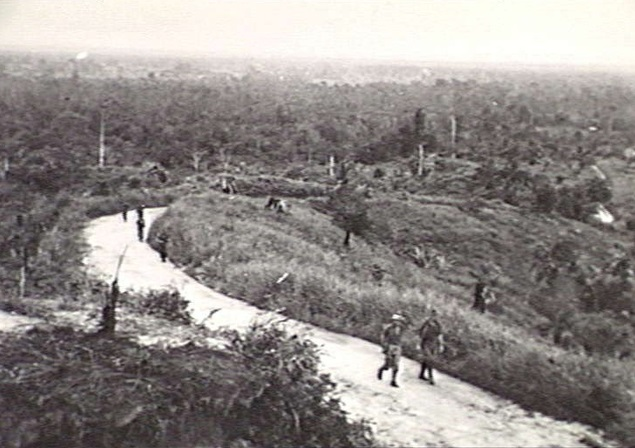
Troops from the 2/13th Battalion patrolling around Miri, August 1945

=== Brunei and Muara Island ===
The second Allied landing that took place on 10 June, consisted of two battalions of Brigadier Victor Windeyer's 20th Brigade—2/15th and 2/17th Battalions—landing at Muara Island and on the mainland peninsula north of Brooketon, supported by a second squadron of Matildas from the 2/9th Armoured Regiment. The 20th Brigade's third battalion, the 2/13th, was held back in brigade reserve. Meanwhile, in the interior, Dayak tribesmen supported by Allied operatives commenced their guerrilla campaign on 9 June. Lightly armed, and with only limited training, these guerrillas sought to harass the withdrawing Japanese, while avoiding decisive engagement. In this role, they met with some success, but were in some cases forced to withdraw in the face of heavy opposition. The troops that had landed near Brooketon on the mainland advanced on Brunei, which was captured on 13 June by the 2/17th Battalion after several minor section and platoon level actions over several days. The 2/15th, which had earlier secured Muara Island, secured Limbang on 18 June, advancing by landing craft up the river in the south-west of Brunei Bay. The two 20th Brigade battalions were now joined by the 2/13th Battalion, which had conducted an unopposed landing at Lutong on 20 June, supported by Spitfire and Kittyhawk fighters operating from Labuan, before continuing their advance down the south-western coast and then overland, passing through Miri and Seria on their way towards Kuching.

At Seria the Australians found the 37 oil wells ablaze, having been deliberately lit by the Japanese defenders as they withdrew, and engineers from the 2/3rd Field Company were called up to put out the fires, a task which took over three months to complete. Kuala Belait was reached on 24 June. Having secured its objectives, the 20th Brigade then began patrolling operations, using landing craft to move quickly along the various rivers and streams that punctuated the coastline. The initial priority of Japanese troops on the mainland was to withdraw inland. As a result, only minor clashes occurred, against Japanese rearguards, which were generally poorly equipped and inexperienced. Resistance and aggressiveness amongst these rearguard elements stiffened as the Australians moved beyond Miri. Generally, the guerrilla forces in the interior carried out their operations separately from the conventional forces that focused mainly upon the coastal areas. However, some co-ordinated action was achieved during the campaign. During July, guerrillas assigned to Operation Semut captured Marudi, on the Barem River, as part of efforts to disrupt the Japanese withdrawal from Miri. A strong Japanese counter-attack retook the village from the lightly armed Semut operatives, after which the guerrillas linked up with conventional Australian infantry from the 2/17th Battalion to capture it once again on 15 July. During the course of their involvement in the campaign, the 20th Brigade's casualties were relatively light, suffering only 40 casualties. Throughout late June and into August, RAAF aircraft including Mosquitos and Beaufighters attacked Japanese targets throughout North Borneo, including barges, shipping, barracks and airfields, sinking an 800-ton vessel near the Tabuan River and destroying several Japanese aircraft on the ground. Wirraways were also used to provide tactical reconnaissance, and other fighters flew close air support sorties.

=== Weston ===
Another landing was made by Allied forces on 16 June on the mainland at Weston, in the north-eastern part of Brunei Bay. The 2/32nd Battalion, which had previously been held back as the divisional reserve, forced its way ashore near Padas Bay. After taking Weston, patrols were sent out to Beaufort, which was 23 km (14 mi) inland. Due to the lack of roads and the indefensible nature of the railway track that led to the town, it was decided to advance along the Klias River, while a secondary force moved along the Padas River. As a part of this phase of the operation, minor landings were made at Mempakul on 19 June and at Sabang on 23 June by elements of the 2/43rd Battalion and the 2/11th Commando Squadron. Kibidang was captured the same day by the 2/43rd, while the 2/32nd advanced further along the Padas River and the two battalions married up. Following this, reinforcements in the form of two companies from the 2/28th Battalion were transferred from Labuan to take over rear area security while plans were made for the main attack on Beaufort.

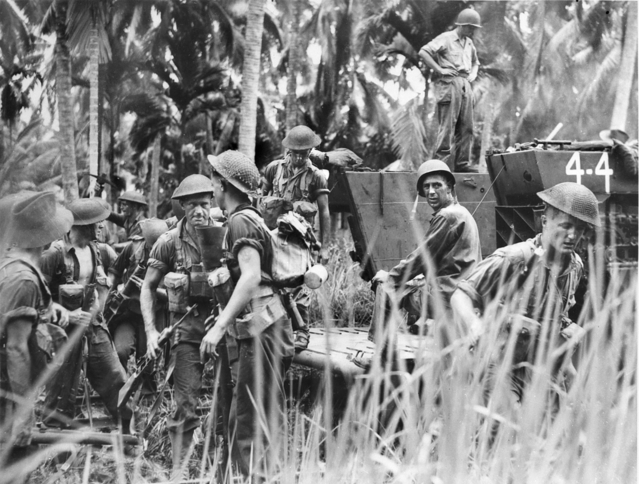
Troops from the Australian 2/32nd Battalion land at Weston aboard US-crewed landing vehicles

The Allies assessed that Beaufort, which lay on the main Japanese avenue of withdrawal, was held by between 800 and 1,000 Japanese troops seeking to keep key egress routes open. On 27 June, the Australians attacked the town. The 2/43rd Battalion was assigned the task of the main assault, while the 2/32nd Battalion was tasked with flank protection. Despite being hamstrung by torrential downpours and unforgiving terrain, the 2/32nd Battalion secured the south bank of the Padas River, while one company from the 2/43rd was sent to take the town and another marched to the flanks, to take up ambush positions along the route that the Japanese were expected to withdraw along. The 2/28th Battalion secured the lines of communication north of the river. The resistance from the Japanese defenders was not co-ordinated and as a result the Australians had secured their objectives by nightfall. Throughout the night, however, the Japanese launched six counterattacks which eventually broke down into hand-to-hand combat. During the course of these actions, one company became isolated and the next morning, 28 June, another was sent to aid it by attacking the Japanese force from the rear. Fighting its way through numerous Japanese positions throughout the afternoon, the company reached its objective in the early evening and launched its assault, killing at least 100 Japanese defenders. It was during the course of this action that Private Tom Starcevich, of the 2/43rd Battalion, performed the deeds for which he was later awarded the Victoria Cross.

By 29 June, the Japanese began to withdraw from Beaufort in small groups. Elsewhere, on 1 July, the Australian 7th Division carried out the final stage of the Allied operation to secure Borneo, landing at Balikpapan, on the south-east coast. In North Borneo, Allied forces observed a brief pause while reinforcements arrived. The 2/3rd Anti-tank Regiment, being used as infantry rather than the anti-tank role for which it was intended, arrived at Weston on 3 July, where it relieved the 2/28th Battalion, which then moved on to Beaufort. On 6 July the Australian advance was resumed. Due to the strategic situation, it was decided to undertake a slow and cautious advance using indirect fire to limit casualties. By 12 July the 2/32nd Battalion occupied Papar, and from there patrols were dispatched to the north and along the banks of the river as offensive operations came to an end.

== Aftermath ==
Following the capture of Papar, the Australians ceased offensive actions on Borneo and the situation remained largely static until a ceasefire came into effect in mid-August. In early August 1945, two atomic bombs were dropped on Hiroshima and Nagasaki, and on 15 August the Japanese Emperor, Hirohito, effectively announced an end to hostilities, with the formal surrender being signed on 2 September 1945. As a result of the ceasefire, the planned Allied invasion of Japan was no longer required and the strategic gains provided by the capture of North Borneo were arguably negated; this included development of Brunei Bay into a naval base, which ultimately never occurred. To some extent, this has led to claims in Australia that the Oboe operations—as well as the campaigns in the Aitape–Wewak region of New Guinea and on Bougainville and New Britain—had been "unnecessary" and had therefore resulted in needless casualties. Throughout the course of the fighting on North Borneo, the Australians lost 114 men killed or died of wounds while another 221 men were wounded. Against this, the Japanese lost at least 1,234 men, while 130 had been captured. On top of this, a further 1,800 Japanese were estimated to have been killed by the guerrilla forces operating in the interior; many of these were Japanese troops who were withdrawing inland following the conventional landings on the coast who were ambushed by guerrillas or attacked by Allied airstrikes directed by these forces. These forces also occupied large areas in Sarawak and the southern parts of North Borneo by the end of hostilities.

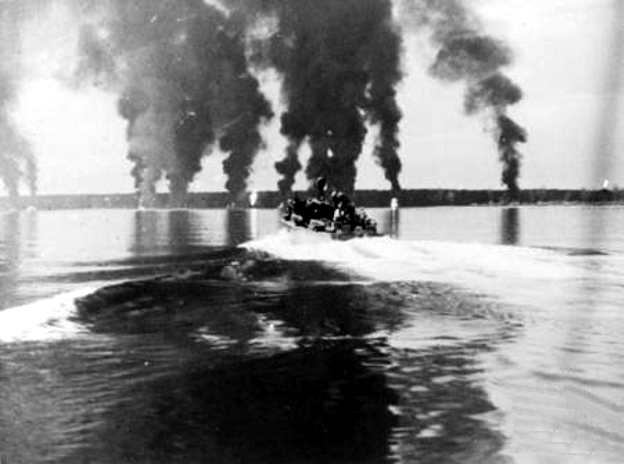
Burning oil wells at Seria

After the fighting was over, the Australians began the task for establishing British civil administration, rebuilding the infrastructure that had been damaged and providing for the civilians that had been displaced in the fighting. This proved to be a significant undertaking, with the 9th Division working to establish hospitals, dispensaries, and schools. Sanitation and drainage had not been provided by the Japanese, and the local population was suffering from disease and was malnourished. Infrastructure was re-built by Australian engineers, while 9th Division medical personnel provided medical aid directly to locals. The 132-kilometre (82 mi) North Borneo railway was also re-established. Houses that were destroyed in pre-invasion bombardment and later fighting were also rebuilt. Following the ceasefire, there were still a large number of Japanese troops in North Borneo—by October 1945 it was estimated that there were over 21,000 Japanese soldiers and civilians still in North Borneo—and the 9th Division was made responsible for organising the surrender, provisioning and protection of these personnel. They were also tasked with liberating the Allied civilian internees and prisoners of war that were being held at Batu Lintang camp in Kuching, Sarawak, and with disarming the guerrillas that had been assigned to Operations Agas and Semut.

As civil administration was slowly restored, in October 1945, the Australian demobilisation process began. Initially this process was slow as there were few troops able to relieve the Australian forces in Borneo and as such only long service personnel were released for return to Australia. The 9th Division remained in North Borneo performing garrison duties until January 1946, when it was relieved by the 32nd Indian Brigade, and subsequently disbanded. For the majority of the 9th Division's personnel a return to civilian life followed, however, as part of Australia's contribution to the occupation of Japan, a number of men from the 9th Division were transferred to the 67th Battalion which was being formed as part of the 34th Brigade. According to the Australian War Memorial, such was the relationship formed between the 9th Division and the civilian population of North Borneo, that the division's Unit Colour Patch was incorporated into the coat of arms of the Colony of British Borneo following the war, remaining as such until 1963, when the region was subsumed by the Malaysian state of Sabah.

== See also ==
- Japanese occupation of Malaya

== Notes ==
Footnotes

Citations
