= Battle of Beaufort (1945) =

1945 battle of World War II

Coordinates: 5°20′44.84″N 115°44′40.43″E

- Part of the Pacific Theatre of World War II
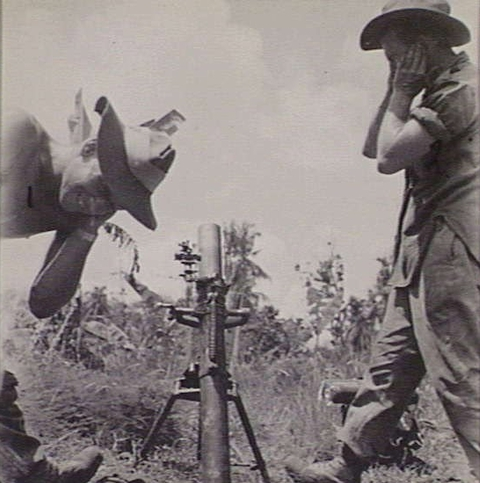
- A 2/43rd Battalion mortar crew firing on Japanese positions near Beaufort on 28 June 1945
Date	26–28 June 1945
Location	Beaufort, North Borneo
Result	Allied victory

Belligerents
Australia	Japan

Commanders and leaders
(Australia) Selwyn Porter	(Empire of Japan) Taijiro Akashi

Strength
Two battalions	800–1,000

Casualties and losses
7 killed, 38 wounded	~ 93 killed, 2 captured

The Battle of Beaufort took place during the Second World War between Allied and Japanese forces. Part of the wider Borneo campaign of the Pacific War, it was fought between 26 and 28 June 1945 in North Borneo (later known as Sabah). The battle formed part of the Allied efforts to secure North Borneo in the final months of the war and saw two Australian infantry battalions attack the town, which was held by a force of around 800 – 1,000 Japanese. Over the course of several days heavy fighting took place before the Japanese began withdrawing on 29 June. While withdrawing, the Japanese were ambushed and suffered heavy casualties.

== Background ==
At the time of World War II, Beaufort was a town in British North Borneo. The town is located on the northern bank of the Padas River and is dominated by hills covered in dense jungle on three sides. The banks of the Padas River are swampy. The town was a key transport hub, as it stood at the junction of two railroads, including a light railway which connected Weston with Jesselton, and a major river. Under the Japanese occupation of British Borneo, Beaufort was an important communications centre for the Japanese forces in the region.

Allied operations to retake Borneo from the Japanese began on 1 May 1945 with an amphibious landing on Tarakan off the northeast coast of Borneo. This was followed by operations to secure North Borneo, which commenced on 10 June 1945, under the designation Operation Oboe Six. This operation had two phases. In the first, Brigadier Selwyn Porter's 24th Brigade was to secure the island of Labuan and Victor Windeyer's 20th Brigade was to capture Brunei Town. Once these objectives were captured, the region between Brunei Bay and Beaufort on the North Borneo mainland was to be occupied, as was the Miri–Lutong–Seria area of Sarawak. Allied forces would then construct bases in these regions, protect oil and rubber resources and re-establish civil governance.

At this time, several Japanese units were at Beaufort. These included the 368th Independent Infantry Battalion, which formed part of the 56th Independent Mixed Brigade, as well as that brigade's engineer and signals units. Other units at Beaufort included the 1st Battalion of the 25th Independent Mixed Regiment, the 20th Independent Machine Gun Battalion, part of the 103rd Field Road Unit, the 11th Southern Army Hospital and the 3rd Company of the 10th Sea Transport Battalion. The 368th Independent Infantry Battalion had just completed a difficult march across the interior of Borneo during which it had suffered heavy casualties.

After the landings on Labuan and around Brunei earlier in the month, on 16 June the Australians crossed Brunei Bay and landed a force on the North Borneo mainland around Weston, coming ashore unopposed. This force consisted of two infantry battalions and supporting elements from the 24th Brigade, detached from the 9th Division. The area was defended by elements of the 56th Independent Mixed Brigade, which formed part of the Thirty-Seventh Army, led by Lieutenant-General Masao Baba. The 56th Independent Mixed Brigade was commanded by Major General Taijiro Akashi.

The purpose of the landing was to clear the area around Brunei Bay, so that it could be used as an advanced naval base for future operations. The 2/32nd Infantry Battalion captured the town of Weston against light opposition. There were no roads leading inland, so the battalion advanced along the single track railway towards Beaufort, while the 2/43rd Battalion landed unopposed around Mempakul – under the cover of artillery firing from Labuan – to secure the Klias Peninsula with the 2/11th Commando Squadron, before moving by barge along the Klias River in concert with several motor gunboats. Reaching Kibidang on 23 June, the 2/43rd then marched overland to the Padas River, linking up with the 2/32nd at Kandu. Sitting at the junction of two railway lines, capturing Beaufort offered the Australians control of the railway that ran towards Jesselton. Beaufort lay on egress routes from the coast, and following the Australian landing on the mainland the Japanese sought to hold Beaufort from the Australians to allow their forces to withdraw.

== Battle ==
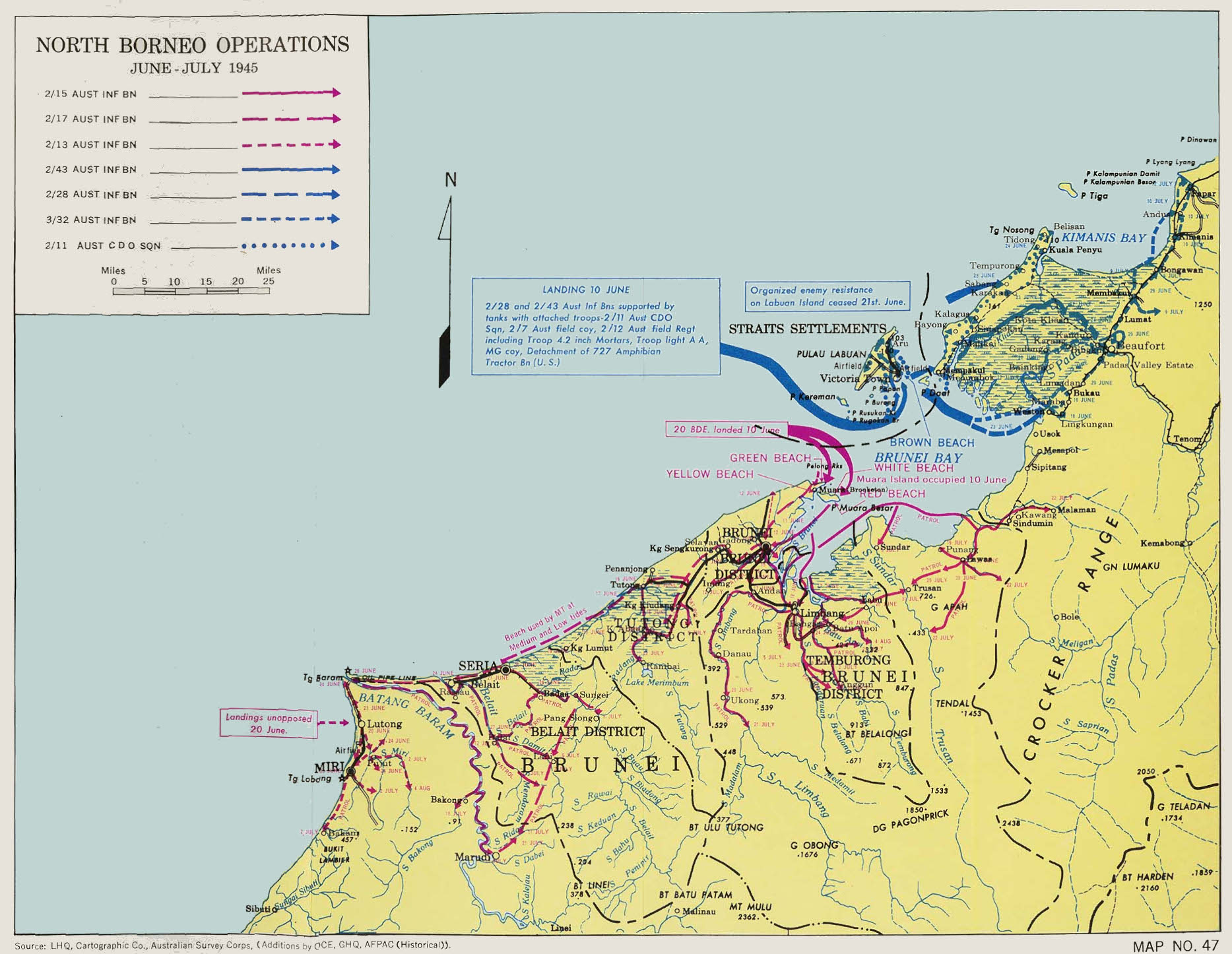
A map showing the movements of the main Australian infantry units in North Borneo during June and July 1945. Beaufort is on the mainland, inland from Brunei Bay and Kimanis Bay

About 800 to 1,000 Japanese held Beaufort, with forward positions covering avenues of approach along the Padas River and along the railway. In order to support their attack, the Australians pushed fourteen 25-pounder field guns forward. On 26 June, the two Australian battalions began the approach towards the town, where they would launch and attack. The 2/43rd Battalion was assigned the task of the main assault, while the 2/32nd Battalion was tasked with flank protection. Despite being slowed by torrential downpour and difficult terrain, the 2/32nd Battalion secured the south bank of the Padas River, while one company from the 2/43rd was sent to take the town and another marched to the flanks, to take up ambush positions along the route that the Japanese were expected to withdraw along. Meanwhile, two companies from the 24th Brigade's third battalion, the 2/28th, which had been transferred from Labuan, secured the lines of communication to the north of the river. They were also tasked with defending the supporting artillery positions. The 2/43rd's attack began at 2:00 pm on 27 June. The supporting artillery held its fire until the attack had begun so as not to alert the defenders prematurely.

The resistance from the Japanese defenders was not co-ordinated and as a result the Australians had secured their objectives by nightfall on the evening of 27/28 June. Throughout the night, however, the Japanese launched six counterattacks. These were eventually repulsed, although in places they broke down into hand-to-hand combat. During the course of these actions, one Australian company became isolated and the next morning, 28 June, another was sent to its aid to attack the Japanese force from the rear. Fighting its way through numerous Japanese positions throughout the afternoon, the company reached their objective in the early evening and launched its assault. The Australians landed a troop of tanks from the river, and engineers worked to clear a route forward for them to exploit; ultimately, the fighting ended before the way was cleared. Meanwhile, heavy artillery and mortar fire fell on the Japanese and they began to withdraw throughout the evening of 28 June. In doing so, many – at least 81 – were killed in the ambush that had been set by the Australians.

By 29 June, the Australians had captured the town; mopping up operations continued throughout the day. Meanwhile, a platoon from the 2/28th Infantry Battalion patrolled to Lumadan, where they came under fire from the hills to the east; in response, artillery was called down and another platoon was dispatched to assist. In the days immediately following the fighting, the Australians maintained pressure on the Japanese, and pushed them further east through a series of patrol actions. With the capture of Beaufort, the Australians were able to open the Weston–Beaufort railway line; improvised rolling stock – carriages pulled by jeeps – were pressed into service to bring supplies forward. The jeeps were supplemented in early July by a steam engine, and were used to carry follow on elements of the 2/28th Battalion to Lumadan. This was followed by further advances commencing on 6 July to secure Papar using barges and the train line between Beaufort and Membakut. The 2/32nd Infantry Battalion entered the town on 12 July and began using it as a patrol base.

== Aftermath ==
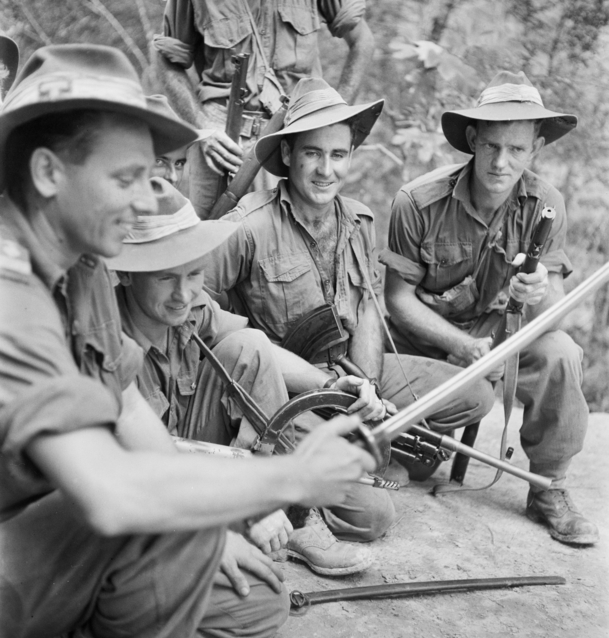
A patrol from the 2/43rd Battalion in the Beaufort area during August 1945

Casualties during the fighting around Beaufort amounted to seven killed and 38 wounded for the Australians, while at least 93 Japanese were killed and two captured. Private Tom Starcevich of the 2/43rd received the Victoria Cross for his actions during the battle. Following the war, the units involved in operations in British North Borneo between 17 and 30 June 1945 were awarded the battle honour "Beaufort".

The fighting around Beaufort was the only occasion Japanese forces attempted to resist the Australian advance in British North Borneo. It was also last significant action fought in North Borneo, although minor engagements continued in the following months. The withdrawing Japanese were followed up with artillery and aerial attacks, as the Australians exploited another 7 kilometres (4.3 mi). Patrol clashes indicated increased Japanese resistance was likely beyond Tenom. The 24th Brigade undertook containment operations to the east of Beaufort, pushing along the railway track only as far as Tenom. This advance aimed to secure Beaufort. The Australian commanders took great care to minimise casualties. For example the 2/28th Battalion used deception and harassing fire to secure an important knoll without any casualties; they held the position until 3 August when the Japanese launched a counterattack that was defeated with one Australian and 11 Japanese being killed.

Elsewhere in North Borneo, the 20th Brigade consolidated their gains around Brunei town at the southern end of Brunei Bay and began exploiting the area southwest, advancing towards Kuching, Miri, Lutong and Seria. The fighting in North Borneo ceased in mid-August 1945. Further afield, on 1 July, the Australian 7th Division landed at Balikpapan on the east coast of Borneo.
