= 2/43rd Battalion (Australia) =

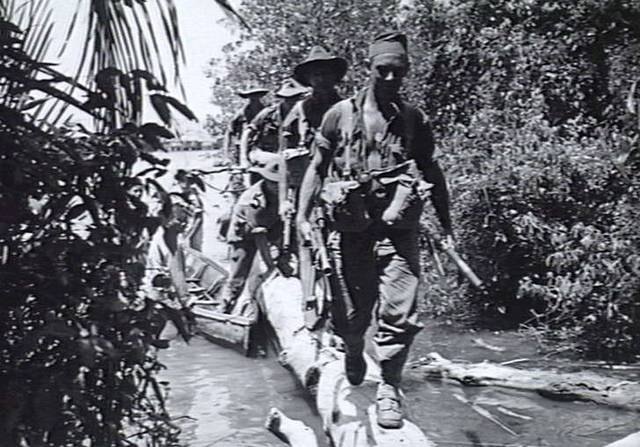
- Soldiers from the 2/43rd Battalion patrolling on Labuan, June 1945
- Active: 1940–1946
- Country: Australia
- Branch: Australian Army
- Type: Infantry
- Size: ~ 800–900 personnel (Note: By the start of World War II, the authorised strength of an Australian infantry battalion was 910 men all ranks; later in the war it fell to 803.)
- Part of: 24th Brigade, 9th Division
- Motto: Nil desperandum
- Engagements: World War II: Siege of Tobruk; Second Battle of El Alamein; Huon Peninsula campaign; Borneo campaign

Insignia
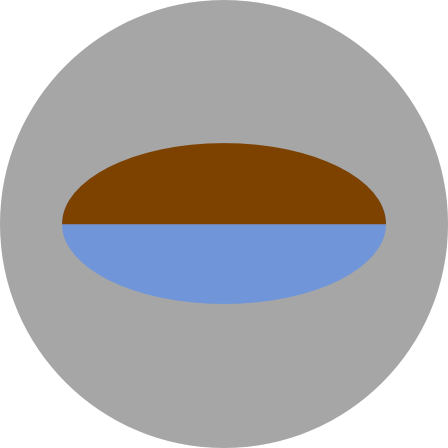
- Unit colour patch (1940–1942)

- (1942–1946)

The 2/43rd Battalion was an infantry battalion of the Australian Army. Raised in July 1940 in South Australia as part of the 24th Brigade, the battalion was initially part of the 8th Division, until the 24th Brigade was re-allocated to the 9th Division in late 1940. It was with this formation that the 2/43rd saw service in the Middle East in 1941–1942, taking part in the fighting at Tobruk and in the First and Second Battles of El Alamein. It also undertook garrison duties in Syria, before returning to Australia early in 1943 to fight against the Japanese in the Pacific.

In 1943–1944, after re-organisation and training to prepare for jungle warfare, the 2/43rd fought in New Guinea, as part of operations to capture Lae and secure the Huon Peninsula. After returning to Australia in early 1944, a long period of training followed on the Atherton Tablelands in Queensland, before the battalion undertook its final campaign of the war, taking part in Allied operations to re-take Borneo from the Japanese in June 1945. Following the end of the war, the battalion was disbanded in February 1946. One member of the battalion, Private Tom Starcevich, was awarded the Victoria Cross.

== History ==
=== Formation and training ===
The 2/43rd Battalion (Note: The numerical designation of 2nd AIF units was prefixed by "2/", which was used to set them apart from Militia units with corresponding numerical designations which had no prefix.) was raised at Woodside, South Australia, on 17 July 1940 from Second Australian Imperial Force (2nd AIF) volunteers. It was one of three infantry battalions assigned to the 24th Brigade – the other two being the 2/25th and 2/28th Battalions – which was initially assigned to the 8th Division. Like other Australian infantry battalions of the time, the 2/43rd had an authorised strength of around 900 personnel, and was organised into four rifle companies – designated 'A' through to 'D' – each consisting of three platoons; these were supported by a battalion headquarters and a headquarters company with six specialist platoons: signals, pioneer, anti-aircraft, transport, carriers and mortars.

Upon formation, the 2/15th was placed under the command of Lieutenant Colonel William Crellin, an Australian Staff Corps officer and Duntroon graduate of the Permanent Military Forces who arrived on promotion from major, having previously served in World War I with the 14th Battalion. The colours initially chosen for the battalion's unit colour patch (UCP) were chocolate and dark blue in an oval shape, inside a circle of grey. These were the same as those of the 43rd Battalion, a South Australian unit that was part of the First Australian Imperial Force during World War I. That unit had been re-raised in South Australia in 1921 as a Militia formation, eventually adopting the designation of the Hindmarsh Regiment. The 2/43rd's unit colour patch was later changed, following the unit's involvement in the fighting at Tobruk, when it adopted a T-shaped UCP consisting of red and white.

The battalion's personnel during the early stages of its existence were volunteers who enlisted within the 4th Military District, which encompassed South Australia and Broken Hill, New South Wales. Many of the commissioned officers and some of the non-commissioned officers had previous military experience in the Militia, while the bulk of the enlisted personnel had no prior military service. Rudimentary individual soldier training was conducted along with sports meets throughout August, followed by skill-at-arms training and range shoots in September, while key appointment holders were sent away on various promotion and other specialist training courses. In early October, the battalion was presented with its battle flag by veterans who had served in the 43rd Battalion during World War I, and a short time later it was announced that the 24th Brigade would be transferred to join the 9th Division in the Middle East. More intense training, including company and battalion-level field training was conducted in the weeks that followed. In late November, the 2/43rd received their Unit colour patches in preparation for deployment and the battalion marched through the centre of Adelaide. Finally, on 28 December 1940, the men entrained at Oakbank, and were transported by rail to Melbourne, where they embarked on the transport Mauretania.

=== North Africa and the Middle East ===
Escorted by the cruiser HMAS Canberra, the Mauretania proceeded along the southern Australian coast as part of a convoy of four other troopships. Reaching Fremantle, Western Australia, on 3 January 1941, a brief shore leave was granted before the convoy set sail across the Indian Ocean. From there, the convoy berthed at Colombo in Ceylon, where further shore leave was granted while arrangements were made to transfer the battalion to another ship, the Nevasa, for the remainder of the journey to Port Tewfik in Egypt, where it disembarked on 2 February 1941. From there, the battalion moved by rail to Palestine, where the 9th Division was attempting to make good its equipment and training deficiencies while the more experienced divisions – the 6th and 7th Divisions – led the Australian Army's efforts in Libya and later Greece. The 2/43rd subsequently moved into camp at Khasa, linking up with another South Australian battalion, the 2/27th, which had prepared the camp for their arrival.

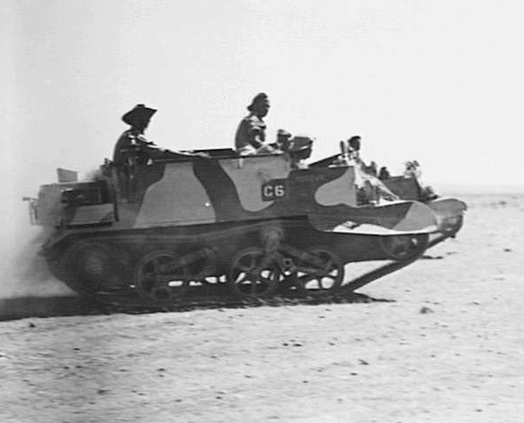
2/43rd Bren carriers on manoeuvre in Syria, June 1942

In early February, acclimatisation training was conducted until the battalion's heavy equipment arrived in camp, including Bren carriers and trucks, when section level and platoon tactical training began. This increased in complexity and progressed to company-level exercises, culminating in battalion offensive manoeuvres. Leave was granted for the soldiers to visit Jerusalem and Tel Aviv. This ceased mid-March, when the battalion was ordered to cross the Suez Canal and take up positions west of the port of Tobruk to complete training prior to relieving the 6th Division in the desert. As British troops advanced west, pushing the Italians back through Libya during Operation Compass, plans were made for the 9th Division to move forward. In the end, only part of the division advanced past Tobruk and, due to lack of transport, the 24th Brigade garrisoned the port itself. In early April the advance turned into a withdrawal as Axis forces, bolstered by the arrival of the Afrika Korps, which had landed around Tripoli, launched a determined counter-attack. The 9th Division, along with the Australian 18th Brigade, from the 7th Division, withdrew intact to Tobruk, and within a week the advancing Axis forces had placed the strategic port under siege. The 2/43rd would remain there, manning defences, mounting patrols and conducting raids, for the next six months.

The battalion's most significant action around Tobruk came on 3 August, when 'A' and 'B' Companies attacked a German outpost on the right flank of the "Salient", designated "R7" by the Allied operational staff. The attack was part of an attempt to reduce the German-held Salient, which had developed in the line south-west of Bianca. In conjunction with the 2/43rd's attack, the 2/28th Battalion attacked the left flank around posts "S6" and "S7" from the north. Heavy fighting around R7 resulted in 100 Australian casualties, the majority being borne by 'B' Company, and the fighting ended in the Australian assault being repulsed followed by a temporary truce for both sides to collect casualties. During the truce, German sappers led the Australian stretcher bearers through the German-laid minefields. Finally, in October, the decision was made to withdraw the Australian garrison from Tobruk by sea. By this time, the 2/43rd was holding the Bardia Road sector, and after two successful raids on Italian positions, which resulted in around 75 Italian casualties, the battalion was withdrawn. As part of the evacuation, the 2/43rd was taken aboard the Australian destroyer HMAS Nizam and the Royal Navy's HMS Latona on 17 October 1941. The Australians were replaced by British troops from the 70th Division, with the 2/43rd handing over to troops from the Durham Light Infantry. Casualties for the battalion during the siege of Tobruk amounted to 38 killed in action, 13 died of wounds, 156 wounded, and four captured.

Following its evacuation from Tobruk, the 2/43rd was landed in Alexandria, after which it moved by buses to Amiriya and then by train, crossing the Suez at Kantara, and arriving in camp at Kilo 89 in Palestine on 20 October. There, the battalion was rested, and received several drafts of reinforcements, mainly consisting of volunteers from Western Australia. In mid-December, after the battalion had moved to Khassa, Crellin handed over command of the battalion to Lieutenant Colonel William Wain, a former Militia officer who had served with the 7th Battalion during World War I, and who came on promotion from the 2/16th Battalion, where he had served as battalion second-in-command. After a bitterly cold Christmas in Palestine, early in the new year, the 9th Division was ordered to move to Syria, where it was to join the Allied garrison that had been established there following the brief Syria–Lebanon campaign to counter a possible Axis attack on the Allied flank through the Caucasus Mountains. The 9th Division was assigned to guard the Tripoli area, in the northern sector of the Allied defence system. Under this plan, the 2/43rd was assigned winter quarters at Arbe, and it spent four months in the Lebanese mountains near Jebel Tourbol, before moving to Bechmezzine in May. Guard duties included manning checkpoints at the mouth of the Chekka Tunnel, while brigade-level exercises were conducted in the Syrian desert around Forgloss in early June. At the end of the month, the 9th Division received orders to move back to Egypt as the situation in North Africa became critical for the Allies, as the Afrika Korps advancing steadily in the Western Desert.

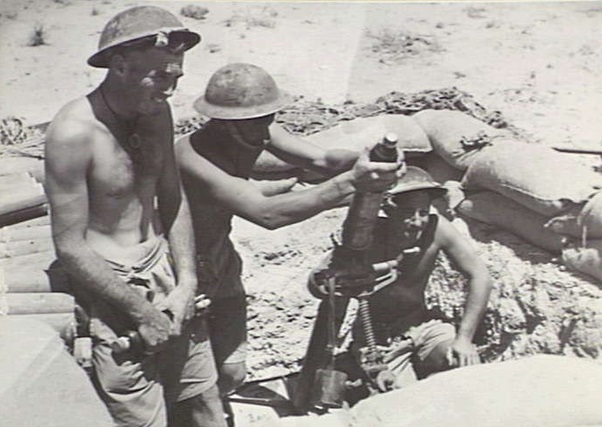
A mortar crew from the 2/43rd during the fighting around El Alamein

Committed to the fighting around El Alamein in early July, the 24th Brigade, having recently completed desert training, moved to Ruweisat Ridge, over 5 miles (8.0 km) south of El Alamein, situated on the coast. For the next four months, the 2/43rd formed part of the northern sector of Allied defences within what came to be known as the "Alamein box". Tasked with harassing Axis forces, the 2/43rd's first action came on the night of 7/8 July, when 'D' Company launched a very successful raid, which caught the German forces in the area by surprise and resulted in the destruction of many vehicles and artillery pieces, as well as the re-capture of a British Bren carrier that was driven away from German lines. On 17 July, the 2/43rd was involved in actions around Ruin Ridge, in conjunction with the 2/32nd Battalion's attack on a position known as Trig 22 on Makh Khad Ridge. Advancing astride the Qattara track, during the action the 2/43rd captured over 1,000 Italian prisoners, for the loss of 81 casualties, before withdrawing from Ruin Ridge. The 24th Brigade launched a follow-up attack on 22 July on Makh Khad Ridge and Ruin Ridge, in conjunction with an attack by the 26th Brigade on Tel Eisa; this attack saw the 2/43rd, having detached one company to support the 2/32nd, heavily committed once again. A further thrust was put in on 26/27 July, with the 2/43rd being tasked with a follow-up role, which was cancelled after attacks by the 2/28th and the British 69th Infantry Brigade failed; instead the battalion only played a supporting role during the attack, bringing up ammunition under fire with its carriers, and providing supporting fire to the 2/28th Battalion. In August and September, during a lull in the fighting, the battalion undertook patrols into no-man's land. Casualties during the first phase of the battalion's involvement in the fighting around El Alamein between early July and mid-October amounted to 36 killed in action, 12 died of wounds, two accidentally killed, 28 wounded and four captured.

Later, after the British forces were reinforced, the Allies launched a counter-offensive, the Second Battle of El Alamein, in late October and early November. During the initial phase of the fighting, the 9th Division was tasked with drawing Axis forces into the northern sector, to allow other elements to prepare for the breakout attempt, codenamed Operation Supercharge. The 2/43rd Battalion formed part of the divisional reserve during the initial stages of the attack, before the 24th Brigade relieved the depleted 26th Brigade, adopting positions around the railway barracks (dubbed the "Blockhouse") on 31 October. The fighting was so intense that it suffered 108 casualties in a single night on 1 November 1942, including 43 killed and seven missing, after being partially overrun. By early November, the tide of the fighting turned and the offensive ultimately wrested control of the fighting in North Africa back towards the Allies. Shortly afterwards the 9th Division was withdrawn from battle for redeployment to the Pacific to fight against the Japanese. The battalion's casualties in the second phase, between 23 October to 5 November 1942, amounted to 45 killed in action, 11 died of wounds, 96 wounded and 27 captured. Those captured ultimately spent the rest of the war in camps in Italy, Austria and Germany, before being repatriated at war's end.

=== New Guinea and Borneo ===
The 2/43rd was withdrawn to Khassa in Palestine in December and took part in a divisional parade that month in Gaza, before embarking aboard the Queen Mary, bound for Australia, in January 1943. The Queen Mary formed part of a large convoy established under Operation Pamphlet to transport the 9th Division back to Australia to fight the Japanese in the Pacific. After around a month at sea, the division arrived at Fremantle on 18 February and, after the Western Australian members disembarked, it continued eastwards, reaching Sydney on 27 February. From there, the battalion entrained from Pyrmont, and by 1 March 1943 had arrived in Adelaide, after which members were granted three weeks leave. A welcome-home parade through the city streets was held that month, watched by a crowd of over 200,000, after which the battalion concentrated at Springbank in Adelaide. They entrained for the Atherton Tablelands on 29 March 1943, reaching Kairi, on 6 April 1943. They would remain there for the next four months, training in preparation for jungle warfare against the Japanese in New Guinea. During this time, the battalion was converted to the jungle divisional establishment, which saw the reduction of its authorised strength to about 800 personnel. The number of vehicles allocated to the battalion was also reduced with heavy vehicles being replaced by jeeps. The carrier and anti-aircraft platoons were removed from the battalion's establishment, while a Vickers machine-gun platoon was raised and the number of mortars allocated for organic indirect fire support was increased. A batch of 338 reinforcements arrived to make up for earlier losses and transfers; many of these men came from states other than South Australia, resulting in a more diverse demographic within the battalion.

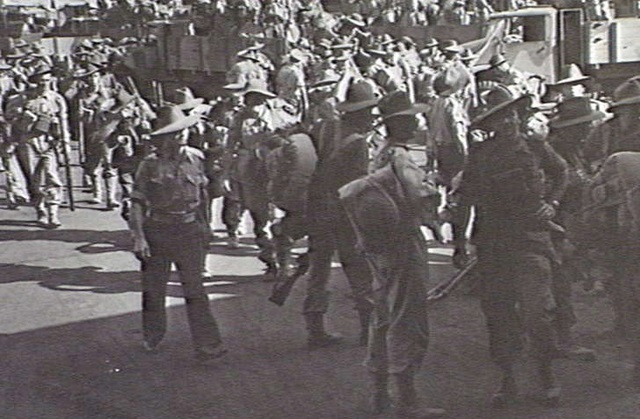
Troops from the 2/43rd Battalion embark at Cairns, 8 August 1943, bound for New Guinea

Training teams arrived from the 2/3rd Battalion, which had already fought the Japanese in New Guinea, and a program of jungle warfare training began, progressing from individual fieldcraft to large-scale exercises. In June, amphibious training was carried with the Australians working with the US 532nd Engineer Boat and Shore Regiment around Trinity Beach. The following month, a new commanding officer, Lieutenant Colonel Robert Joshua, arrived. In early August, the battalion moved by road to Cairns. On 8 August 1943, the 2/43rd embarked upon HMAS Manoora, bound for Milne Bay in New Guinea. There, the battalion undertook further training in preparation for its debut in the Pacific. In mid-August, it moved by landing craft to Buna. It continued training there until 5 September, when the 24th Brigade embarked in landing craft for beaches near Lae, arriving the day after the main landing as part of follow-on forces behind the 20th and 26th Brigades. For 11 days, the battalion advanced west as part of a two-pronged advance on Lae, the 7th Division advancing overland from Nadzab while the 9th Division moved along the coast. Initially, there was only limited opposition from the Japanese as the battalion advanced through the villages of Buso and Apo, and the Singaua Plantation. The Burep River was crossed, but the Australian advance west was slowed by numerous water obstacles and eventually torrential rain which flooded the Busu River. At this point, Japanese resistance stiffened and after the 24th Brigade forced its way across the Busu, the 2/43rd advanced slowly along the coast, reaching Wagan to the south of Malahang airfield. On 16 September, the 7th Division entered Lae, with the 2/43rd situated around the Butibum River. The advance on Lae cost the battalion 18 killed and 25 wounded.

Later in September, the Australians undertook an opposed amphibious landing at Scarlet Beach, on the Huon Peninsula. The 20th Brigade led the 9th Division ashore on 22 September, and the 2/43rd Battalion arrived on 30 September as part of reinforcements that were sent when it became clear that the Japanese in the area were stronger than first believed. As Japanese opposition to the lodgement increased, the 2/43rd relieved the beleaguered 2/17th around Jivevaneng, 5 kilometres (3.1 mi) east of Sattelberg. While the 2/17th joined the Australian advance south, the 2/43rd established a blocking position around Jivevaneng to guard the western flank and in early October fought off a strong attack by a battalion from the Japanese 80th Infantry Regiment amidst a strong Japanese counterattack around the Finschhafen area. Later, the battalion pushed north of Scarlet Beach over the Song River to reconnoitre the area around North Hill, Pino Hill and Pabu in preparation for an advance towards Bonga and Guisika, during which it located several key tracks and junctions. In late November, it fended off an attack around North Hill before taking part in the advance towards Wareo, relieving the 2/32nd around Pabu, during which Japanese artillery and mortar attacks caused heavy casualties. The battalion then advanced towards the Kalueng Lakes and later into the Christmas Hills, severing the Bonga–Wareo track, which the Japanese had been using for resupply. In one ambush, 37 Japanese were killed around a position the Australians called "Horace the Horse". By early December, having suffered many casualties from disease, the battalion returned to the North Hill area to assume defensive positions, and a lull followed before it was withdrawn back to Finschhafen for Christmas. On 23 January 1944, the 2/43rd embarked upon the Thomas B. Corwin, reaching Townsville on 31 January. Casualties during operations around Finschhafen resulted in 56 killed and 86 wounded.

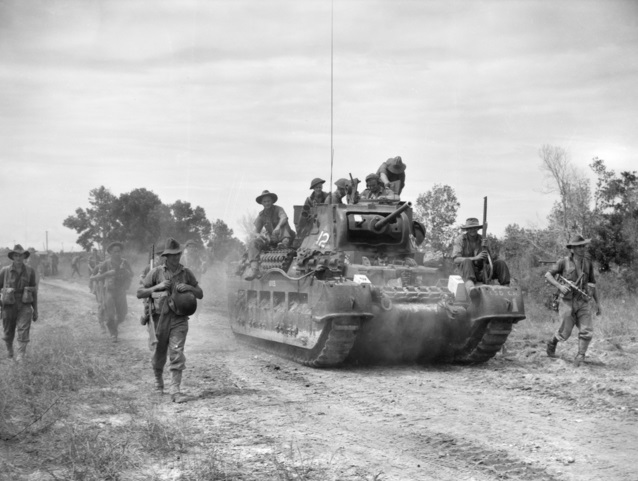
Troops from the 2/43rd advance with Matilda tank support on Labuan, June 1945

After its return to Australia, the battalion was granted a 24-day leave period before re-grouping in March at Ravenshoe, Queensland, to begin preparations for the next phase of the war. The battalion experienced a high turnover of personnel, and by the time it went into combat again in mid-1945, only 141 personnel who had deployed to the Middle East in 1940 remained. A new commanding officer, Lieutenant Colonel Noel Simpson, arrived in May 1944, along with a large batch of other reinforcements, replacing many men still suffering malaria from the previous campaign. A long training period ensued, as there was a degree of uncertainty about the Australian Army's role in future operations in the Pacific after the US military assumed primary responsibility for combat operations in the theatre. Nevertheless, in the final months of the war the 2/43rd took part in efforts to recapture Labuan and North Borneo as part of Operation Oboe Six.

Embarking in April 1945 on board the General H.W. Butner from Townsville, the 2/43rd staged out of Morotai Island. Now under the command of Lieutenant Colonel Mervyn Jeanes, who had taken over from Simpson following his elevation to command the 29th Brigade on Bougainville, the 2/43rd spent six weeks on Morotai Island preparing for the Labuan operation. Finally, in June, the battalion embarked on the Manoora and two US Landing Ship Tank vessels, LST 640 and LST 585, and made the seven-day voyage to the island of Labuan, where it came ashore unopposed in three waves, landing on Brown Beach on the southern tip of the eastern headland to Victoria Harbour. Supported by tanks and artillery, the 2/43rd pushed inland and, after some brief skirmishes, advanced along the southern coast on the right of the 2/28th Battalion, and then north to secure Labuan airfield, which was taken by the end of the first day for the loss of four casualties. The battalion then cleared the eastern coast towards the Kerupang River and exploited west across on the island along the axis of Hamilton Road towards Timbalai airfield. Mopping up as they went, the troops fought several actions as Japanese opposition stiffened around MacArthur's Road, while mines and booby traps also caused several casualties. The battalion's total losses during the 11-day campaign amounted to one killed and 12 wounded.

By 17 June, Allied planes began operating from Labuan airfield and the 2/43rd Battalion was transferred across Brunei Bay to the mainland, landing at Menumbok and Mempakul, after an amphibious reconnaissance, along with the 2/11th Commando Squadron. Two companies and the battalion headquarters landed at Mempakul on 19 June, and the 2/43rd subsequently advanced up the Klias River, using barges and landing craft, while the 2/32nd Battalion advanced along the Padas River. By late June, the two battalions converged on Beaufort, linking up to the west of Kandu, and between 26 and 29 June 1945, the town was the scene of heavy fighting during which the 2/43rd lost 13 men killed and 30 wounded. The 2/43rd was tasked with taking the high ground to the north of the town around the Woodford Estate and Mount Lawley, and carrying out a flanking attack to the east. For his actions in destroying four Japanese machine-gun positions, Private Tom Starcevich was awarded the Victoria Cross. After the capture of Beaufort, the fighting continued in the area as the 2/28th Battalion kept up the pressure on the withdrawing Japanese; for the 2/43rd, though, Beaufort proved to be the last significant action of the war, as hostilities ended in mid-August, following the atomic bombings of Hiroshima and Nagasaki. The battalion's final campaign of the war cost it 56 casualties, including those killed or wounded on Labuan.

=== Disbandment ===
Following the conclusion of hostilities, the 2/43rd Battalion remained on Borneo, around Beaufort, processing Japanese prisoners of war, conducting civic engagement programs, and undertaking vocational education courses in preparation for discharge. The demobilisation process began with personnel being prioritised based on length of service and other factors. A number of drafts were repatriated to Australia over several months. Just before Christmas, the remnants of the battalion, now down to a strength of about 250 personnel, moved to Mempakul, where they relieved the 2/15th Battalion. In January 1946, the battalion's remaining cadre returned to Australia aboard the motor vessel Reynella, reaching Brisbane on 17 January 1946. At Chermside, the battalion's equipment and weapons were accounted for, before the unit was disbanded on 20 February 1946 at Puckapunyal, Victoria.

During the conflict a total of 2,711 men served with the battalion. Its casualties amounted to 186 killed in action, 57 died from wounds, 12 died from other causes, 556 wounded, and 36 captured. Decorations awarded included one Victoria Cross, two Distinguished Service Orders, 13 Military Crosses, three Distinguished Conduct Medals, 24 Military Medals including one Bar, one British Empire Medal, and 45 Mentions in Despatches. In addition, one member of the battalion was appointed a Member of the Order of the British Empire.

== Battle honours ==
The 2/43rd received the following battle honours:

- Beaufort, Borneo, Busu River, Defence of Alamein Line, Defence of Scarlet Beach, Defence of Tobruk, El Alamein, Finschhafen, Labuan, Pabu, and Tell el Makh Khad.

These honours were subsequently entrusted to the 43rd Battalion in 1961. This unit was re-raised in 1966 as a national service battalion, and through this link the honours are maintained by the Royal South Australia Regiment.

== Commanding officers ==
The following officers commanded the 2/43rd during the war:

- Lieutenant Colonel William Crellin (1940–1941)
- Lieutenant Colonel William Wain (1941–1943)
- Lieutenant Colonel Robert Joshua (1943–1944)
- Lieutenant Colonel Noel Simpson (1944–1945)
- Lieutenant Colonel Mervyn Jeanes (1945)

== Notes ==
Footnotes

Citations
