= 2/3rd Anti-Tank Regiment (Australia) =

Australian Army anti-tank artillery unit

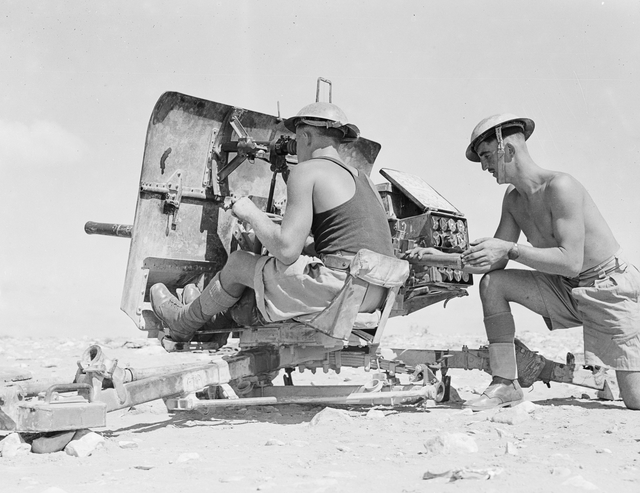
- 2/3rd Anti-Tank Regiment gunners at Tobruk, September 1941
- Active: 1940–1945
- Country: Australia
- Branch: Australian Army
- Type: Royal Australian Artillery
- Role: Tank attack
- Part of: 8th Division; 9th Division; I Corps
- Engagements: World War II: Siege of Tobruk; First Battle of El Alamein; Second Battle of El Alamein; New Guinea campaign; Borneo campaign

Insignia
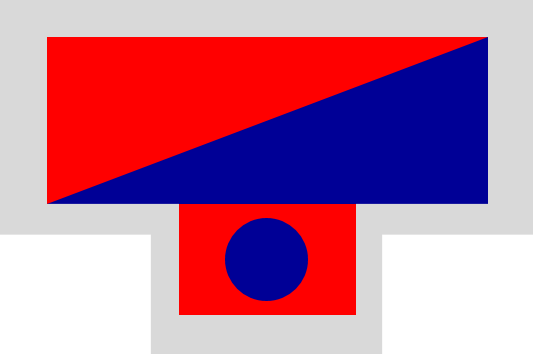
- Unit colour patch

The 2/3rd Anti-Tank Regiment was an Australian Army anti-tank artillery regiment that was raised for service during the Second World War as part of the all volunteer Second Australian Imperial Force. It was formed in July 1940, and was assigned to the 8th Division, but was later reassigned to the 9th Division. With this formation, the regiment took part in the Siege of Tobruk in 1941 and then the First and Second Battles of El Alamein in 1942. After returning to Australia in early 1943, the regiment became a corps-assigned unit, and its individual batteries served in New Guinea in 1943–1944, and then Borneo against the Japanese in 1945.

== History ==
=== Formation and service in North Africa ===
The 2/3rd Anti-Tank Regiment was formed in July 1940 at Warwick Farm, New South Wales, as part of the all volunteer Second Australian Imperial Force that was raised for overseas service during World War II. The regiment was assigned to the 8th Division on formation but it was later transferred to the 9th Division; its first commanding officer was Lieutenant Colonel Eoin Munro. It initially consisted of four batteries – the 9th, 10th, 11th, and 12th – and like other such units raised at this time, had an authorised strength of 30 officers and 526 soldiers, and forty-eight Ordnance QF 2-pounder guns, although it did not initially receive these weapons and initial training was undertaken using simulated weapons. In September, the regiment moved to Ingleburn, New South Wales, before embarking for the Middle East in November, arriving the following month. Further training was undertaken at Julis, in Palestine.

In February – March 1941, the regiment joined the rest of the 9th Division; the regiment was sent to Amiriya in Egypt, where they were hastily issued with a mix of weapons including captured Solothurn anti-tank rifles, Italian 47 mm guns, and 37 mm Bofors guns. Amidst the chaos and confusion of the German offensive in Cyrenaica, the regiment was dispersed across several locations – the 9th Battery garrisoned the port of Tobruk, while the 12th remained on the Egyptian border. The 11th Battery, and regimental headquarters, was allocated to support the 3rd Indian Motor Brigade at Mechili, where they were heavily engaged over three days in early April. After the town was surrounded by Axis armoured forces, the force attempted to break out and withdraw back to Tobruk. Some was eventually captured; the regiment lost 91 men captured, including Munro, as well as four others killed and seven wounded.

The remnants of the regiment, then under the command of Major Henry Glover, concentrated around Tobruk where the 9th Battery joined them as the town fell under siege. New 2-pounder guns were issued, and the regiment assumed command of several infantry anti-tank companies (the 20th and 24th). They were heavily engaged over Easter, as the Germans launched a heavy armoured assault against the perimeter. Meanwhile, the 12th Battery was cut off from the regiment, and was assigned to the 22nd Guards Brigade carrying out defensive actions around the frontier, before being transferred to support the 7th Armoured Division. In August, the battery deployed to Mersa Matruh, rejoining the Australian 9th Division. The rest of the regiment remained in Tobruk until September, taking part in the defence of the town before being relieved by a British unit, and withdrawn by sea back to Palestine. Its losses during the siege amounted to 11 killed, 39 wounded and 96 captured.

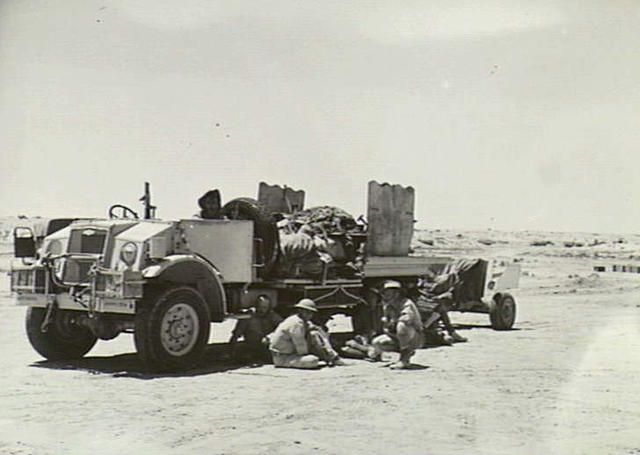
6-pounder gun and vehicle, 2/3rd Anti-Tank Regiment, August 1942

Following withdrawal from Tobruk, the regiment was reformed at Hill 95 before moving to Qastina Camp to rejoin the rest of the 9th Division. It was expanded to a 64-gun regiment, and absorbed several anti-tank companies at this time. They deployed to Syria in January 1942, undertaking defensive duties around Tripoli as part of the Allied occupation force, remaining there until June 1942 when they were recalled to Egypt after the Germans launched an offensive. By July, the regiment was commanded by Lieutenant Colonel J.F. Herbertson; the 2-pounders were replaced by 6-pounders around this time. Detaching a battery to support each of the 9th Division's three infantry brigades, over the course of several months the regiment took part in defensive fighting during the First Battle of El Alamein. Casualties throughout July amounted to 23 killed, 80 wounded and 46 captured. Later, during October and November, the regiment supported the offensive actions of the Second Battle of El Alamein, during which the 9th Division carried out attacks towards the coast, before the Allied breakthrough in early November. The 2/3rd Anti-Tank Regiment fired 1,276 rounds during 13 days of heavy fighting, during which 36 guns were destroyed.

=== Service in New Guinea and Borneo ===
In December, the regiment was withdrawn back to Palestine, at which time preparations began for the 9th Division to return to Australia, where they were to join the other 2nd AIF divisions fighting the Japanese. Embarking in January 1943, the regiment returned to Australia by sea, and reached Sydney the following month. A period of leave followed, before the regiment was reconstituted at Kairi, Queensland; around this time it was re-designated the 2/3rd Tank Attack Regiment. As the Australian Army was reorganised for the fighting in the Pacific, it adopted the jungle division establishment. This saw a reduction in the number of anti-tank batteries assigned to each division to one, as the armoured threat was considered low in the Australian Army's area of operations in the Pacific; as a result the regiment became a corps asset, assigned to I Corps. The 9th Battery was subsequently assigned to the 4th Division, and was transferred out of the regiment, moving to Townsville, Queensland, while the 12th Battery was temporarily assigned to the 6th Division.

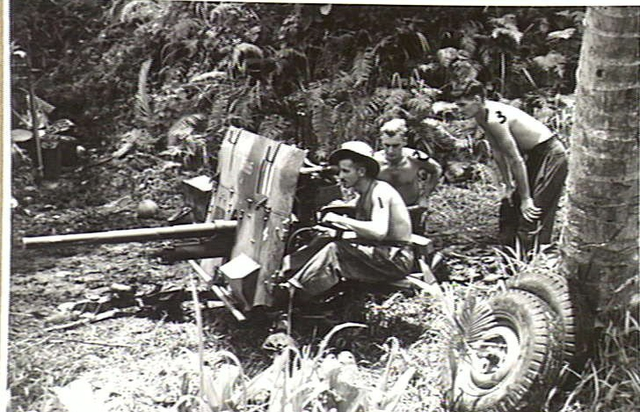
2/3rd Anti-Tank Regiment gun, New Guinea, November 1943

The 10th Battery deployed to New Guinea in July, initially with a view to provide support during the advance through the Markham Valley; however, the lack of Japanese armour meant they remained around Port Moresby and were used in a defensive role, and undertook manual labour until returning to Australia in April 1944. Meanwhile, in September 1943, the 11th Battery was detached for the landing at Lae, supporting the 9th Division. Later, it deployed to support the 20th Brigade around Scarlet Beach during operations to secure Finschaffen, manning defensive positions along the beach, before returning to Australia in March 1944. In May 1944, the regiment was reconstituted, with the 10th and 11th Batteries rejoining regimental headquarters at Mapee, Queensland; in August, they moved to Wongabel. The 12th Battery returned to the regiment in September 1944, when the 6th Division deployed to Aitape–Wewak where there was no need for anti-tank support.

By late 1944, the jungle division establishment was changed, and the allocation of anti-tank batteries restored to three per division. The regiment moved to Ravenshoe, Queensland, concentrating with the rest of the 9th Division at this time in preparation for deployment overseas. By December 1944, the regiment was under the command of Lieutenant Colonel J.N.L Argent, on the Atherton Tablelands. He subsequently commanded the regiment during its final campaign of the war, the recapture of Borneo. The move began in March 1945, via Cairns, Queensland, and then to Morotai Island; the regiment undertook labouring duties in May loading ships to support the 26th Brigade's operation to retake Tarakan. Further stevedoring work was undertaken in June before the regiment embarked to support landings around Labuan and Brunei. There was no real anti-tank role for them, and as such during the advance on Weston and Beaufort, the regiment was employed mainly as makeshift infantry assigned to the ad hoc Gusforce, to carry out patrols around Sipitang; it also employed a variety of weapons, including 4.2-inch mortars, 6-pounder anti-tank guns and 75 mm pack howitzers. At the end of the fighting the regiment undertake garrison duties on the Natuna Islands.

== Legacy and perpetuation ==
Approximately 1,800 personnel served in the 2/3rd Anti-Tank Regiment during its existence. The Australian War Memorial lists 70 members of the regiment on the Roll of Honour as having lost their lives during the war, while 28 members were decorated as a result of their service.

Post war, the regiment was perpetuated by the 3rd Anti-Tank Regiment, which was raised in 1948 within the part-time Citizens Military Force. This unit was later converted to a field artillery regiment, and in the 1950s was re-designated as the 23rd Field Regiment, Royal Australian Artillery.

The regiment was later reduced to a battery and in 2018 was assigned to the 9th Regiment, Royal Regiment of Australian Artillery.
