= The Westralian Judean =

The Westralian Judean was an English-language magazine published for the Jewish interests in Western Australia.

== History ==
The magazine was created as the result of a chance conversation at the Jewish Athletic Club. Philip Masel (1908 – 27 February 1972) (Note: Masel was born in Perth and married concert singer Marian Mendelsohn in 1931. He transferred from the CMF to the 2/28th Infantry Battalion in 1940 and saw action in Tobruk and El Alamein. He served on several Arts bodies including the ABC and was manager of Worth's Stores, of Hay Street, Perth.) and Olisch Silbert.

Its first issue was published in November 1924 with the slogan A Jewish Soul, An Australian heart, A Cultured Mind and subsequently appeared monthly.

Rabbi Israel Brodie B.A. B.Litt (later Sir Israel) was a regular contributor from 1925.

In September 1929 it changed hands. Joshua "Josh" Pilpel (Note: Pilpel was born of Russian parents in Safed, Palestine, and emigrated to Australia some time around 1912,) was the new printer and publisher.

Alick Masel (died 1953) contributed Yiddish humour (written alphabetically), under the pen name Shmerel Hotzmun.

Dr Giuseppe (or Joseph) Gentilli (Note: Gentilli was born in Italy on 13 March 1912; arrived in Fremantle on 12 September 1939 by the Ormonde, and was naturalized on 28 September 1945) took over the editor's chair when Masel joined the Army at the outbreak of WWII.

In September 1940 Solomon Rufus "Sol" Davis LL.B. took over from Masel, who had joined the army.

Silbert resigned as honorary editor in 1945 and died in August 1951. Mrs Geulah Stern took over as editor in 1945.

== Trove ==
Copies of The Westralian Judean of 1925 and September 1929 – September 1955 have been copied by the National Library of Australia and may be accessed via Trove.
