= Noel Simpson (general) =

Australian Army officer

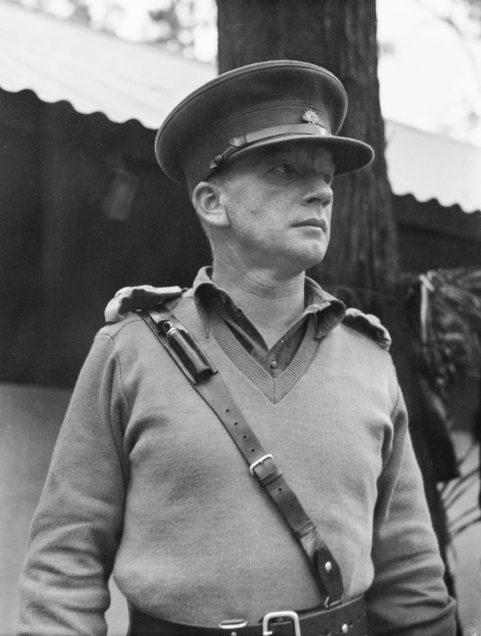
- Simpson as a lieutenant colonel, 1945
- Born: 22 February 1907; Balmain, New South Wales
- Died: 18 November 1971 (aged 64); Heidelberg, Victoria
- Military career
- Allegiance: Australia
- Branch: Australian Army
- Service years: 1925–1964
- Rank: Major General
- Commands: 3rd Division (1959–60); 6th Brigade (1953–58); 23rd Brigade (1945–46); 29th Brigade (1945); 2/43rd Battalion (1944–45); 2/17th Battalion (1942–44)
- Conflicts: Second World War; Syria–Lebanon campaign; North African campaign; New Guinea campaign; Bougainville campaign
- Awards: Companion of the Order of the Bath; Commander of the Order of the British Empire; Distinguished Service Order & Bar; Efficiency Decoration; Mentioned in Despatches

Major General Noel William Simpson, CB, CBE, DSO & Bar, ED (22 February 1907 – 18 November 1971) was an Australian Army officer who served during the Second World War, commanding at both battalion and brigade level. In the post-war military, he rose to command the 3rd Division before serving on the Military Board as the Citizen Military Forces member, retiring in 1964. He was a banker in civilian life, rising to the role of assistant-inspector of the National Bank of Australasia. He died in 1971, at the age of 64.

== Early life ==
Simpson was born on 22 February 1907, in Balmain, New South Wales, to Harry and Annie Simpson. His father was an orchardist who had been born in Sydney, while his mother, Annie (née Thomas), had migrated from New Zealand. Noel was the younger of a set of twin boys; his brother, Grosvenor, would also undertake military service, and the pair were both initially commissioned into the Militia 17th Battalion, although Grosvenor would later serve in the British Army and would be killed at Anzio in 1944. After completing his schooling at North Sydney Boys' High School, Simpson joined the National Bank of Australasia in late 1922; he would remain with them for his entire working life except for the period of his war service.

== Military career ==
While employed by the National Bank of Australasia in civilian life, Simpson began his military service in 1925, serving in the part time military forces. He was commissioned as a lieutenant in 1926 and served in a number of infantry battalions – the 17th, 25th/33rd, 34th and 45th – during the inter-war years, rising to the rank of major by the time the Second World War broke out. Volunteering for overseas service, Simpson was appointed to the Second Australian Imperial Force and posted to the 2/13th Battalion as second-in-command.

Simpson deployed to the Middle East with them in late 1940, but shortly after arrival, he was seconded to the headquarters staff of the 7th Division, and later in the Syria–Lebanon campaign against the Vichy French in mid-1941. In early 1942, he returned to the 2/13th before being promoted to lieutenant colonel in March 1942 and taking command of the 2/17th Battalion; at this time he gained a reputation for his thorough training methods, and he subsequently led the battalion successfully through the Second Battle of El Alamein as the Allies launched a heavy offensive against the Germans and Italians in North Africa.

In 1943, Simpson's unit was brought back to Australia in preparation for operations against the Japanese in New Guinea. They undertook intensive training in Queensland, including amphibious landings, which eventually paid dividends when the 2/17th took part in the Huon Peninsula campaign, carrying out a landing at Scarlet Beach on 22 September 1943. Throughout September and October, despite being wounded, Simpson led the battalion in heavy fighting around Kumawa, and then Jivevaneng, where they held off a Japanese force that had threatened to encircle them. As the Australians then advanced on Sattelberg in November, Simpson temporarily commanded the 24th Brigade and then later the 20th Brigade.

After returning to Australia, Simpson was posted to the 2/43rd Battalion, commanding them as they undertook training in Queensland ahead of the Borneo campaign. However, he would not see action with them; instead, Simpson was promoted to brigadier in March 1945 and placed in command of the 29th Brigade, a Militia formation tasked with joining II Corps' 3rd Division on Bougainville, where the Australians had begun a limited offensive after taking over from US forces in late 1944.

Prior to Simpson's arrival, the 29th Brigade had relieved the US 182nd Infantry Regiment before commencing the advance along the southern coast in December 1944. After about a month, the brigade returned to the main Allied base around Torokina for a rest. Simpson arrived on Bougainville on 28 March, and the following month the brigade began defensive operations protecting the supply lines that were maintaining the Australian thrust towards the Japanese stronghold around Buin. In July, the brigade was tasked with resuming the offensive, commencing with crossing the Mivo River, but as patrols began to push forward towards the Oami River heavy rain brought the drive to a premature halt, with the war ending before it could resume in August.

Simpson took over command of the 23rd Brigade in November 1945, and led the formation back to Australia where it was demobilised in mid-1946 at Watsonia, Victoria.

After the war, Simpson resumed his civilian career with National Bank, but returned to the part time military in the post war period. He was the honorary aide-de-camp to the Governor General in 1950, and between 1950 and 1953 filled a staff role in Eastern Command. In 1953–1958, he commanded the 6th Brigade before being promoted to major general and taking over the 3rd Division in 1959–1960. In 1960–1962, he was the Citizen Military Forces representative of the Military Board – essentially holding the highest position available for a part-time officer – before going on to the Reserve of Officers list for the final part of his career. He retired from military service on 23 February 1964, having reached compulsory retirement age after nearly 40 years service.

== Later life and legacy ==
During the war, Simpson was awarded the Distinguished Service Order (DSO) for his actions during the fighting around El Alamein and was awarded a Bar to the DSO for his role in the early part of the Huon Peninsula campaign. He was later mentioned in despatches (1947), and appointed a Commander of the Order of the British Empire (1956) and a Companion of the Order of the Bath (1963). He was also awarded the Efficiency Decoration in 1946.

In his later life, Simpson continued to work for National Bank, serving as an assistant inspector until he retired in 1966. He died on 18 November 1971 in Heidelberg, Victoria. He never married.
