= 24th Brigade (Australia) =

Infantry brigade of the Australian Army during World War II

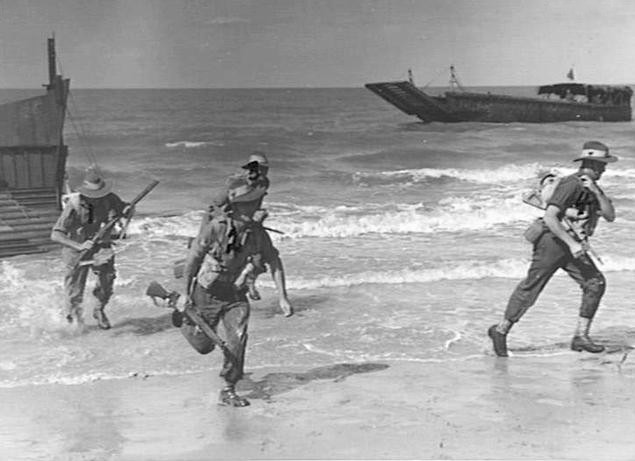
- 24th Brigade personnel exercise at Palm Beach, August 1944
- Active: 1940–46
- Country: Australia
- Branch: Australian Army
- Type: Infantry
- Size: Brigade
- Part of: 8th Division (1940); 9th Division (1940–46)
- Engagements: World War II: Western Desert Campaign; New Guinea campaign; Huon Peninsula campaign; Battle of Labuan; Battle of North Borneo

Commanders
- Notable commanders: Selwyn Porter

Insignia
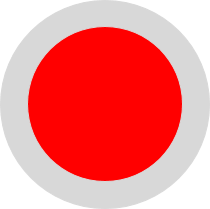
- Unit colour patch 1940–1942

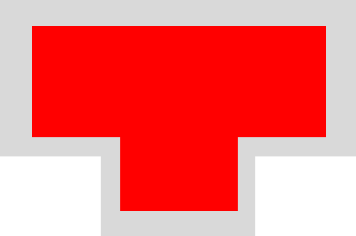
- 1942–1946

The 24th Brigade was a brigade-sized infantry unit of the Australian Army. Formed on 1 July 1940 as part of the Second Australian Imperial Force, the unit was raised for service during World War II. Originally formed as part of the 8th Australian Division the brigade was subsequently transferred to the newly created 9th Australian Division in December. The brigade served during the Western Desert Campaign, forming part of the Allied garrison during the Siege of Tobruk. Later, the brigade was withdrawn to Syria for occupation duties, but then later took part in the First and Second Battles of El Alamein. In early 1943, the brigade was returned to Australia to fight against the Japanese in the Pacific. In 1943–1944, the brigade fought in New Guinea, taking part in the landing at Lae and the Huon Peninsula campaign. Its final campaign came late in the war, when it took part in the Labuan landings and the Battle of North Borneo in mid-1945. After the war, the brigade was disbanded in early 1946.

== History ==
=== Formation ===
The brigade was formed on 1 July 1940 as part of the all volunteer Second Australian Imperial Force (2nd AIF). Consisting of three infantry battalions – the 2/25th, 2/28th and 2/43rd – the brigade was recruited from Queensland, Western Australia and South Australia. It opened its headquarters at Grovely, but moved to Enoggera a month later; its constituent units completed their training in their home locations, though. Upon establishment, the brigade was assigned to the 8th Division. The brigade's Queensland based battalion, the 2/25th, was detached in October 1940 and sent to garrison Darwin, Northern Territory; the same month, the 24th Brigade was transferred to the newly formed 9th Division. This was part of a reorganisation of the 2nd AIF, which saw the less experienced units moved to the 9th Division, while those that were ready for combat were moved to the 7th Division. The 2/25th Battalion was later transferred to the 25th Brigade, while it was replaced by the 2/32nd Battalion, which had been formed in the United Kingdom and would marry up with the brigade in the Middle East. In December 1940, the 24th Brigade embarked for the Middle East, arriving in Palestine in February 1941, where the brigade concentrated, bringing together all three of its battalions for the first time. The brigade's first commander was Brigadier Eric Plant.

=== Middle East ===
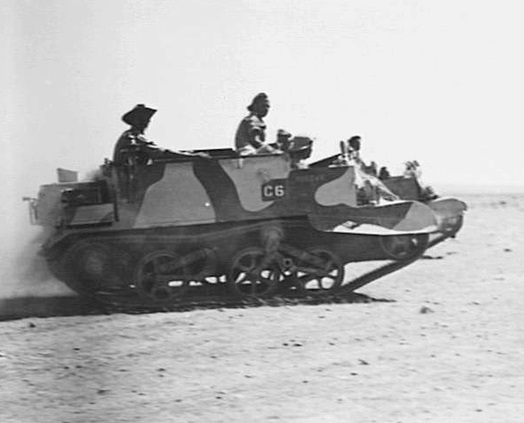
Bren carriers from the 24th Brigade on manoeuvre in Syria, June 1942

The initial fighting in the Western Desert Campaign had been undertaken by the Australian 6th Division, which had launched a series of attacks in January 1941, with the Battle of Bardia. As the most experienced and prepared formation, it was subsequently sent to Greece to help defend against a German invasion there. To free the 6th Division up, the 9th Division was sent to relieve them around Benghazi. The 24th Brigade had not completed its training, so it was held back around Tobruk during this time, and placed in reserve. The 2/32nd joined the brigade at this time. In February 1941, Brigadier Arthur Godfrey, who had previously commanded the 2/6th Battalion, took over command of the 24th Brigade. After German forces landed around Tripoli to reinforce the Italians in North Africa, a large scale withdrawal began as the British and Australian forces were pushed back towards Tobruk, which was subsequently surrounded and placed under siege. The 9th Division was subsequently assigned to the eastern sector of the Allied perimeter and over the brigade undertook defensive duties for the next several months, rotating around the position. In July and August, they held the Salient, taking over from the 20th Brigade; in this sector they carried out patrols and launched a minor attack. Elsewhere, they carried out raids against Italian positions in May and then again in September. Finally, in September 1941, the British 16th Infantry Brigade relieved the 24th, which was withdrawn by sea back to Palestine, less the 2/43rd Battalion, which was withdrawn the following month.

A period of rest and reorganisation followed before the 9th Division was sent to Syria in January 1942, relieving the 7th Division, which was to return to Australia due to the threat posed by Japan's entry into the war. In Syria, the 9th Division formed part of the Allied garrison that had been established there following the Syria–Lebanon campaign. Relieving the 21st Brigade, the 24th occupied positions in the interior, with its units spread out between Sir ed Danie, Haret Jedide, El Ayoun and Arle, although the 2/32nd moved from El Ayoun to Ramlieh in March. During May and June, the brigade rotated with the 26th Brigade to allow each formation to carry out collective training ahead of future operations, whilst still maintaining a defensive posture. By the end of June, the 9th Division received orders to return to Egypt, as the Germans began an offensive in North Africa that threatened the Allied base around Alexandria. The 24th Brigade established defensive positions around Lake Maryut in July, before being ordered to move forward to join the fighting in the First Battle of El Alamein. During this defensive battle, the brigade was temporarily detached to the British 1st Armoured Division and carried out raids from Ruweisat Ridge towards Alam Baoshaza. After returning to the 9th Division, the 24th Brigade carried out a series of attacks around the Qattara Track, Tel el Makh Khad and Ruin Ridge. During the assault on Ruin Ridge, the 2/28th Battalion suffered heavy losses when it became cut off, with the majority of the battalion eventually being taken prisoner. To make up for this loss, the 2/3rd Pioneer Battalion was temporarily assigned to the brigade, whilst the 2/28th was rebuilt in Palestine. Meanwhile, the rest of the brigade fought to hold the German offensive and in September launched a series of raids in preparation for a coming offensive.

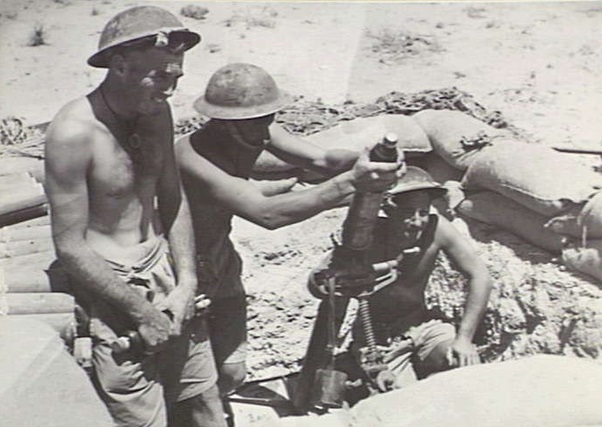
A mortar crew from the 24th Brigade during the fighting around El Alamein, 30 July 1942

In late October, the Allies went on the offensive, launching the Second Battle of El Alamein. The 9th Division was assigned a role in the initial break-in effort, attacking around Tel el Eisa. As a part of this effort, the 24th Brigade launched a diversionary assault around the coast against the 15th Panzer Division. As initial efforts to achieve a break in were only partially successful, the 20th and 26th Brigades, having achieved some success in their areas, struck north in a renewed effort. Later, the 24th Brigade took over from the 26th which was heavily depleted from its efforts; together with the 2/3rd Pioneers they repelled a German counter-attack, securing the Allied break-in, which was achieved in early November through the positions captured by the 20th Brigade. During the fighting in early November, the brigade's commander, Godfrey was mortally wounded by an artillery barrage, and was replaced by Brigadier Bernard Evans, previously of the 2/23rd Battalion. In the wake of the break-in effort, other Allied units exploited their success, and after carrying out mopping up operations, the 24th Brigade was withdrawn back to Palestine, in preparation for the 9th Division's return to Australia for future operations in the Pacific against the Japanese.

=== New Guinea ===
A period of leave followed, after which the brigade's personnel concentrated around Kairi on the Atherton Tablelands in Queensland. Here they began reorganising for jungle warfare, in preparation for deployment to New Guinea. After amphibious warfare training around Cairns, the brigade took part in the capture of Lae, which envisaged a two-pronged assault with the 7th Division advancing from Nadzab. Assigned as a follow on force, in early September 1943 the brigade staged out of Buna, and arrived at the landing beach 16 miles (26 km) east of Lae, several days after the initial landing by the 20th and 26th Brigades. The 26th Brigade had led the advance towards Lae, but was replaced by the 24th, which took over the advance along the coast at the Burep River, while the 26th Brigade pushed inland. Heavy rain flooded the Busu River, and held up the advance, however, with the support of US engineers from 2nd Engineer Special Brigade the 24th Brigade was able to force their way across and continue the advance towards Malahang airfield, where they defeated strong Japanese resistance on 15 September before linking up with the 25th Brigade, which had advanced from Nadzab. In the aftermath, the 2/32nd provided a detachment to secure the Tami Islands, where a radar station was built, while the rest of the brigade concentrated around the Burep River to prepare for future operations.

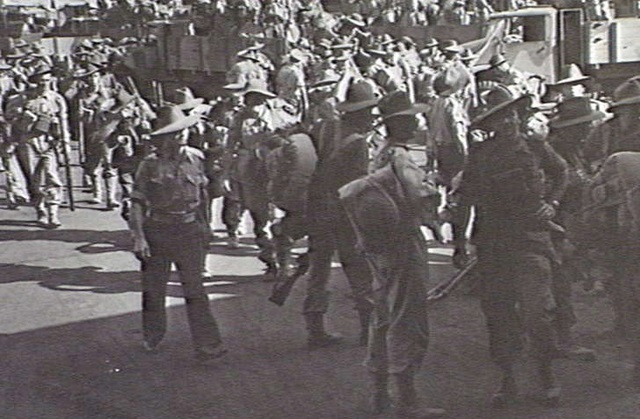
Troops from the 24th Brigade embark at Cairns, 8 August 1943, bound for New Guinea

After the capture of Lae, the Allies decided to follow up their success with another amphibious operation to secure Finschaffen, as part of plans to secure control of the Huon Peninsula and Vitiaz Strait. The initial Landing at Scarlet Beach was carried out by the 20th Brigade, although the 2/43rd Battalion was detached from the 24th Brigade in late September to help defend the beachhead. The 2/43rd subsequently took up a blocking posting around Jivevaneng, relieving the 2/17th Battalion, while the main elements of the 20th Brigade advanced south to capture of Finschhafen. Throughout early October, the 2/43rd came under consistent attack, and it became clear to the Australians that the Japanese were preparing to launch a counter-attack. As a result the 24th Brigade's other two battalions, as well as the 9th Division's headquarters were landed by 11 October. The counter-attack came on 16 October, around Jivevaneng and around the coast, and the 24th Brigade was heavily involved in the fighting, eventually repelling the Japanese attack. The 26th Brigade arrived on 20 October to reinforce the Australians and in mid-November they captured Sattelberg. In early November, Brigadier Selwyn Porter took over command of the brigade. As the Australians began the advance north from Sattelberg towards Wareo, the 24th Brigade advanced up the coast towards Gusika and the Lakes that sat astride the Gusika–Wareo track, while the 20th Brigade advanced on their left towards Nongora. In December, the 4th Brigade took over the advance along the coast towards Fortification Point, while the 9th Division units were rested. In January 1944, the 24th Brigade was withdrawn back to Finschhafen, and from there they embarked for Australia the following month.

=== Borneo ===
A couple of months of leave followed for the brigade's personnel, after which it concentrated at Ravenshoe, in Queensland. Here the 1st Australian Corps was brought together and reorganised in preparation for future operations. By this stage in the war, the role of Australian troops in the Pacific had largely been taken over by US troops, and there were only limited combat opportunities for Australian troops in the last years of the war in the Pacific. As a result, a long period of training followed, and it was not until the final months of the war that the 24th Brigade was deployed again, when they were committed to securing Borneo. Within this campaign, the 24th Brigade was tasked with landing on Labuan, as part of the wider Battle of North Borneo, in order to secure an anchorage in Brunei Bay for the British Pacific Fleet.

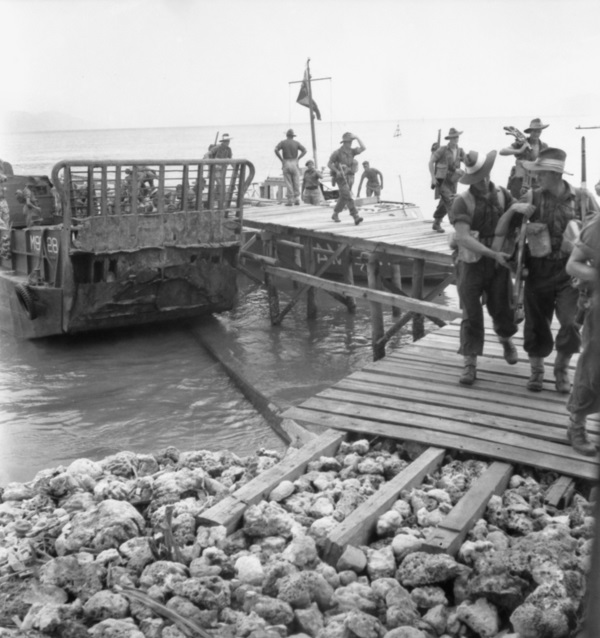
Troops from the 24th Brigade land at Jesselton, September 1945

Staging out of Morotai Island, where they arrived in April 1945, the 24th Brigade carried out the landing on Labuan on 10 June. The 2/28th and 2/43rd Battalions led the brigade ashore, with the 2/32nd Battalion being held back in reserve for the entire division, ready to be deployed to mainland Brunei, or to Labuan as required. Following the landing, the 2/43rd fought to secure the airfields at Labuan and Timalai, while the 2/28th undertook some hard fighting on the left of the Australian lodgement, in an area dubbed "the Pocket". This resistance was overcome by 21 June with tank support.

Elsewhere, the 2/32nd Battalion subsequently landed on Labuan on 12 June, but was transferred to the mainland several days later, where it captured the town of Weston before moving on towards Beaufort. It was assessed that Beaufort was occupied by up to 1,000 Japanese defenders, and as a result, following the fighting on Labuan, the remainder of the 24th Brigade was landed on the mainland. The 2/43rd landed around Mempakul to secure the Klias Peninsula with the 2/11th Commando Squadron, before moving by barge along the Klias River. They then marched overland to the Padas River, linking up with the 2/32nd at Kandu to join the attack on Beaufort on 27/28 June, during which over 100 Japanese were killed. Meanwhile, the 2/28th went ashore around Weston and carried the advance towards Papar, which was reached in July. The war came to an end in mid-August, by which time the brigade was tasked with securing Japanese prisoners in northern Borneo and helping to re-establish British civil administration through the British Borneo Civil Affairs Unit.

=== Disbandment ===
Following the conclusion of hostilities, the brigade was used to oversee the surrender of Japanese troops in the local area, and maintaining law and order until civilian authorities could be re-established. During this time, the brigade's battalions were spread out between Papar, Jesselton, Membakut, and Beaufort. In October 1945, the brigade commander, Porter, marched out of the unit, and the 2/32nd Battalion's commander, Lieutenant Colonel Thomas Scott, assumed administrative command, holding the position until early December 1945 when he was discharged but not replaced. The demobilisation process began in October and continued for several months. The first unit to be declared redundant was the 2/28th Battalion which was moved back to Labuan in late October, in preparation for their return to Australia. Based on a priority system, each battalion began returning troops to Australia in drafts, as shipping became available. Other troops were transferred to the 66th Infantry Battalion for further service as occupation troops. Meanwhile, a vocational education and training program was implemented to prepare the soldiers for their return to civilian life and to keep them occupied while they waited for demobilisation. In mid-December, the brigade's headquarters moved from Papar to Labuan and a large draft of personnel were returned to Australia. The final draft from the 24th Brigade embarked on the transport Lake Charles Victory on 10/11 January 1946. They landed in Brisbane ten days later and the brigade was disbanded at Chermside on 29 January 1946.

== Attached units ==
The following units were assigned to the brigade during the war:

- 2/25th Battalion to 25th Brigade
- 2/28th Battalion
- 2/43rd Battalion
- 2/32nd Battalion from 25th Brigade

== Commanding officers ==
The following officers commanded the 24th Brigade during the war:

- Brigadier Eric Plant (1940–1941)
- Brigadier Arthur Godfrey (1941–1942)
- Brigadier Bernard Evans (1942–1943)
- Brigadier Selwyn Porter (1943–1945)
