= 2/32nd Battalion (Australia) =

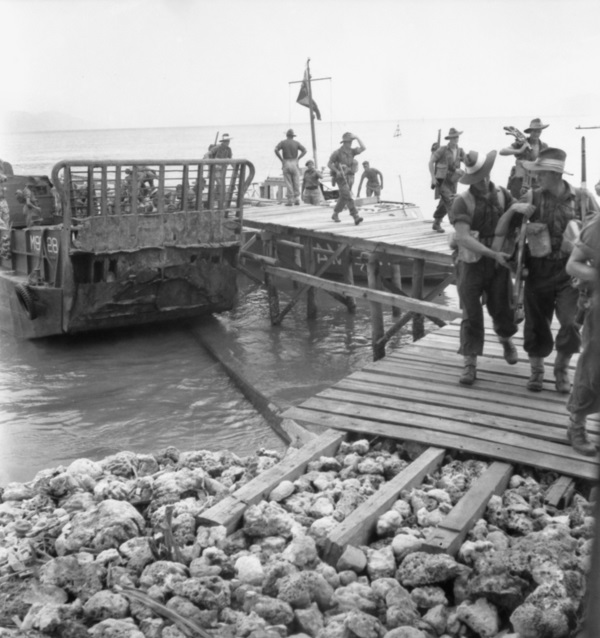
- Troops from 'D' Company, 2/32nd Battalion coming ashore at Jesselton, September 1945
- Active: 1940–1946
- Country: Australia
- Branch: Australian Army
- Type: Infantry
- Size: ~800–900 personnel (Note: By the start of World War II, the authorised strength of an Australian infantry battalion was 910 men all ranks, however, later in the war it fell to 803.)
- Part of: 25th Brigade, 9th Division; 24th Brigade, 9th Division
- Engagements: World War II: Siege of Tobruk; First Battle of El Alamein; Second Battle of El Alamein; Huon Peninsula campaign; Borneo campaign

Insignia
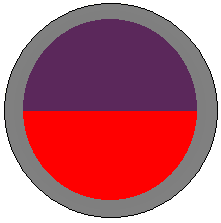
- Unit colour patch (1940–1942)

- (1942–1946)

The 2/32nd Battalion was an infantry battalion of the Australian Army, which served during the Second World War. Formed in June 1940 from surplus Australian troops who had been sent to the United Kingdom shortly after the Fall of France, the battalion was originally designated the "71st Battalion", before being redesignated. After completing training in the United Kingdom, the 2/32nd served in North Africa in 1941–1942 as part of the 25th Brigade, which was assigned to the 9th Division, before being assigned to the 24th Brigade. In early 1943, the battalion returned to Australia and later took part in campaigns against the Japanese in New Guinea in 1943–1944 around Lae and on the Huon Peninsula, and in Borneo, landing on Labuan in mid-1945, before being disbanded in 1946.

== History ==
Initially designated the 71st Battalion, the unit was raised in the United Kingdom in June 1940, as part of the 25th Brigade, which was formed from Australian troops that had been sent to the country to help bolster the garrison after the Fall of France. Understrength upon formation, the battalion consisted of only three rifle companies at the outset, rather than the usual four, and drew personnel from infantry reinforcements and surplus support corps troops. Under the command of Lieutenant Colonel Alonzo Sparkes, individual and collective training was completed at Tidworth Barracks and Colchester, and by October 1940, the battalion was redesignated as the 2/32nd Battalion, (Note: The numerical designation of 2nd AIF units was prefixed by "2/", which was used to set them apart from Militia units with corresponding numerical designations.) to bring them into line with the other units of the Second Australian Imperial Force. At the time, along with the troops of the 18th Brigade, they were tasked with responding in the event of a cross-Channel invasion.

The circumstances of the battalion's establishment overseas resulted in the unique situation of the battalion's personnel being issued two different unit colour patches. Personnel who were in the United Kingdom at the end of 1940 were issued with a circular UCP consisting of purple over red, with a border of grey. However, this UCP was issued without reference to Army Headquarters in Australia, who issued battalion reinforcements in Australia with a UCP consisting of an upright white and yellow rectangle inside a grey circle: this was intended to link the battalion to the 32nd Battalion, which had served during the First World War. Upon arrival at the unit, though, these patches were replaced with the purple and red patches. The battalion received a third UCP, following the unit's involvement in the fighting at Tobruk, when the 9th Division units adopted a T-shaped UCP.

The feared invasion of the United Kingdom never eventuated, and by early 1941, the two Australian infantry brigades that had been sent to the United Kingdom were transferred to the Middle East. Arriving there in March 1941, the 2/32nd Battalion, along with the rest of the 25th Brigade, joined the 9th Division. A fourth company was raised while the battalion completed further training in Palestine and then, in April, the battalion joined the fighting in the Western Desert. After the Allies were pushed back to Tobruk, the 2/32nd Battalion was moved forward by train to Mersa Matruh, and then by ship to the encircled port of Tobruk. By May, they were firmly established and around this time, the battalion was transferred to the 24th Brigade, joining its other two battalions in the defence of the port. They remained there, conducting patrols and manning the line, until 23 September 1941, when the majority of the Australian garrison was withdrawn by sea. The 2/32nd subsequently served in Palestine and Lebanon until July 1942 when the 9th Division was called upon to help stem the tide of the German and Italian advance around El Alamein; throughout the remainder of the year, the battalion took part in the First and Second Battles of El Alamein.

In December 1942, the battalion was withdrawn back to Gaza, where the 9th Division concentrated prior to departure from the Middle East; the Japanese had entered the war in the Pacific the previous year, and the Australian government had requested that their troops be returned as they were needed for the fighting in New Guinea. After a parade at Gaza in December, the 9th Division departed the Middle East in January 1943, arriving back in Australia the following month.

A period of reorganisation followed, during which time the battalion was converted to the jungle divisional establishment, before being committed to the fighting for the first time in the Pacific in September 1943, when they were assigned to capture Lae, during the final stages of the Salamaua–Lae campaign. After conducting an amphibious landing north-west of the town, the battalion's involvement in the fighting was limited as it was held back as part of the divisional reserve throughout the operation and Lae was captured sooner than expected. The battalion's next campaign followed only a few weeks later, when the operations to secure the Huon Peninsula were launched, with the 24th Brigade landing at Finchhafen in late September. Throughout the following months, the 2/32nd was involved in the fighting around the landing beaches and then the advance inland. It was heavily involved in the fighting around Pabu, where over 195 Japanese were killed before the Australians continued the advance into the Christmas Hills in December 1943. The battalion's campaign ended in February 1944, when it was withdrawn back to Australia for rest.

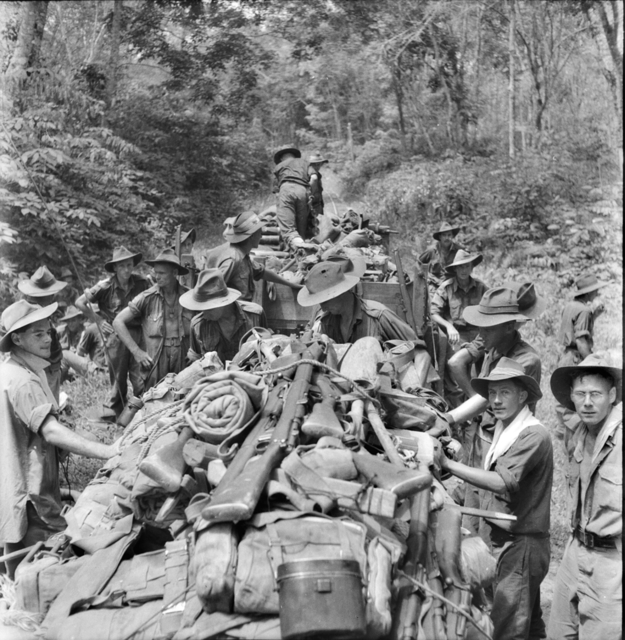
2/32nd Battalion stores being transported by jeep on Borneo, July 1945

A long period of training followed on the Atherton Tablelands, as inter-Allied politics resulted in limited opportunities for the employment of Australian troops throughout 1944 and into 1945. As a result, it was not until mid-1945 that the 2/32nd went into battle again. The Borneo campaign ultimately proved to be their final involvement in the war. During the initial operations to capture Labuan, the battalion remained in reserve, and only came ashore on 12 June. The battalion was transported from Labuan to Padas Bay four days, on 16 June, via landing craft, and following this took part in capturing Weston the next day. The 2/32nd subsequently patrolled towards Beaufort, carrying out an attack on the town in concert with the 2/43rd Battalion on 26 June, to secure the Weston–Beaufort railway line. Throughout early July the battalion advanced towards Papar. The main advance was made along the railway line with a flanking move being provided by one company that conducted an amphibious landing to the south; after these moves, the town was subsequently taken on 12 July 1945.

Following the end of hostilities in August, the 2/32nd's personnel were repatriated to Australia in drafts for demobilisation or transfer to other units for further service. The remaining personnel were transported back to Australian as a cadre in January 1946, at which time the 2/32nd was disbanded. During its service, a total of 2,916 men served with the battalion of whom 214 were killed, 567 wounded and 225 captured. Members of the 2/32nd received the following decorations: three Distinguished Service Orders, four Military Crosses, four Distinguished Conduct Medals, 16 Military Medals, and 42 Mentions in Despatches; in addition, three members of the battalion were appointed as Officers of the Order of the British Empire.

== Battle honours ==
The 2/32nd Battalion received the following battle honours:

- North Africa 1941–42, Defence of Tobruk, Defence of Alamein Line, El Alamein, South-West Pacific 1943–45, Finschhafen, Defence of Scarlet Beach, Liberation of Australian New Guinea, Borneo, Lae–Nadzab, Beaufort, Tell el Makh Khad, Sanyet el Miteirya and Pabu.

In 1961, these battle honours were entrusted to the 32nd Battalion, and through that link are now maintained by the Royal Victoria Regiment.

== Commanding officers ==
The following officers served as commanding officer of the 2/32nd:

- Lieutenant Colonel Alonzo Sydney Clive Sparkes (1940–1941);
- Lieutenant Colonel Raymond Keith Anderson (1941);
- Lieutenant Colonel Thomas Mayo Conroy (1941–1942);
- Lieutenant Colonel David Adie Whitehead (1942).
- Lieutenant Colonel John Walter Balfe (1942); and
- Lieutenant Colonel Thomas Henry Scott (1942–1945).

== Notes ==
Footnotes

Citations
