= Tom Starcevich =

Australian soldier, Victoria Cross recipient

Tom Starcevich VC
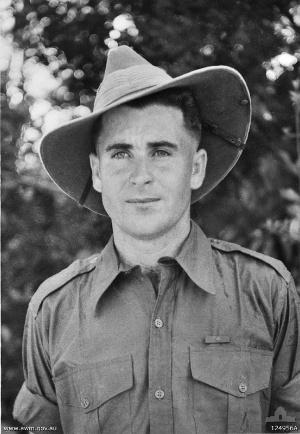
- Leslie Starcevich in November 1945
- Born: Leslie Thomas Starcevich; 5 September 1918; Subiaco, Western Australia
- Died: 17 November 1989 (aged 71); Esperance, Western Australia
- Military career
- Allegiance: Australia
- Branch: Second Australian Imperial Force
- Service years: 1941–1946
- Rank: Private
- Conflicts: Second World War; North African Campaign; First Battle of El Alamein; New Guinea Campaign; Huon Peninsula campaign; Borneo campaign
- Awards: Victoria Cross

Leslie Thomas Starcevich, VC (5 September 1918 – 17 November 1989) was an Australian recipient of the Victoria Cross, the highest decoration for gallantry "in the face of the enemy" that can be awarded to members of British and Commonwealth armed forces. He received the award as member of the 2/43rd Battalion, during the Borneo campaign of the Second World War.

== Early life ==
Leslie Thomas "Tom" Starcevich was born on 5 September 1918 at Subiaco, Western Australia, the son of immigrants: Gertrude May Starcevich (née Waters; born c. 1897, Dunkirk, Kent, England) and Josip Starčević (born 13 February 1892, in Lic, Croatia-Slavonia, Austro-Hungarian Empire). The couple were married in 1915 at Mount Magnet, Western Australia. Starcevich and his older brother, Joseph Frederick "Joe" Starcevich (20 August 1915 – 27 May 2007), grew up on a farm at Grass Patch, north of Esperance. Tom and Joe were two out of ten siblings.

== Military service ==
Following the outbreak of the Second World War, Tom and Joe Starcevich enlisted in the Second Australian Imperial Force: Joe on 23 October 1940, after which he was assigned to the 2/4th Machine Gun Battalion; and Tom on 9 April 1941 (service number WX11519), becoming a member of the 2/43rd Infantry Battalion. Joe Starcevich became a prisoner of war following the surrender of Singapore on 15 February 1942. He endured harsh conditions in captivity, including forced labour at Japanese prisoner of war camps at Changi Prison, the Burma-Thailand Railway and Nagasaki, Japan but survived the war.

Tom Starcevich served with the 2/43rd Battalion in the North African campaign and was wounded in the thigh on 17 July 1942 at Ruin Ridge, Egypt during the First Battle of El Alamein. He also saw action the following year in the Huon Peninsula during the New Guinea campaign.

The 9th Division landed in Brunei Bay on 10 June 1945 with the 2/43rd Battalion landing at Labuan Island. Nine days later the battalion moved to the mainland and, on 28 June, during the capture of Beaufort, during fighting in North Borneo, the lead section of Starcevich's company came under fire from two Japanese machine-gun positions and suffered casualties. Starcevich, a Bren gunner, moved forward and assaulted each position in turn, killing five Japanese soldiers and causing the remainder of the machine guns' crews to retreat. Later that day, when the company was again held up by two machine gun positions, Starcevich adopted similar tactics and single-handedly captured both positions, killing seven members of their crews. For his actions, Starcevich was awarded the Victoria Cross. The citation for the award was published in the London Gazette on 6 November 1945, reading:

For most conspicuous gallantry and extreme devotion to duty at Beaufort, North Borneo, 28th June, 1945.

WX.11519 Private L. Starcevich was a member of the 2nd /43rd Australian Infantry Battalion during the capture of Beaufort, North Borneo.

During the approach along a thickly wooded spur, the enemy was encountered at a position where movement off the single track leading into the enemy defences was difficult and hazardous.

When the leading section came under fire from two enemy machine gun posts and suffered casualties, Private Starcevich, who was Bren gunner, moved forward and assaulted each post in turn. He rushed each post, firing his Bren gun from the hip, killed five enemy and put the remaining occupants of the posts to flight.

The advance progressed until the section came under fire from two more machine gun posts which halted the section temporarily. Private Starcevich again advanced fearlessly firing his Bren Gun from the hip and ignoring the hostile fire captured both posts singlehanded, disposing of seven enemy in this assault.

These daring efforts enabled the Company to increase the momentum of its attack and so relieve pressure on another Company which was attacking from another direction.

The outstanding gallantry of Private Starcevich in carrying out these attacks singlehanded with complete disregard of his own personal safety resulted in the decisive success of the action.

Starcevich was presented with the ribbon of the Victoria Cross by Brigadier Victor Windeyer, during a unit parade at Papar in North Borneo on 12 November 1945. He was presented with the actual medal at Government House, Perth on 27 May 1947 by Sir James Mitchell, Lieutenant Governor of Western Australia.

Starcevich held the rank of private throughout his military service and was discharged on 12 February 1946, as part of the prolonged demobilisation process that followed the end of hostilities. He reportedly wanted to re-enlist in the Australian Army during the Korean War, but his wife talked him out of it.

== Post-war life ==
Starcevich spent the first four years after the war as a motor vehicle sales representative in Perth. He married Kathleen Betty Warr (née Hardy), at the Perth registry office on 19 December 1947. The couple had three children but divorced in 1969.

From 1951, Tom and Joe Starcevich obtained and jointly worked a 4,300-acre (1,700 ha) soldier settlement wheat and sheep farm at Carnamah. In 1981, Tom Starcevich moved back to Grass Patch, where he had bought a small farm. He died at Esperance, Western Australia, on 17 November 1989, aged 71, and was buried at the local cemetery with military honours.

== Memorials ==
The track in Borneo on which Starcevich's celebrated action occurred was later renamed Victoria Cross Road. He is also commemorated by Starcevich Monument.

Starcevich's VC is on display at the Army Museum of Western Australia, in Fremantle, Western Australia. A bronze statue of Starcevich was unveiled at Grass Patch in 1995. The Leslie Starcevich Ward at the former Repatriation General Hospital, Hollywood is named in his honour.
