= Selwyn Porter =

Australian Army officer and Chief Commissioner of Victoria Police

Selwyn Havelock Watson Craig Porter
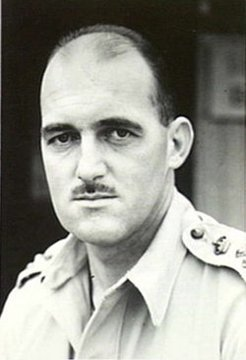
- 1942 portrait
- Born: 23 February 1905; Tintaldra, Victoria
- Died: 9 October 1963 (aged 58); Mentone, Victoria
- Military career
- Allegiance: Australia
- Branch: Australian Army
- Service years: 1924–1954
- Rank: Major General
- Nickname: "Promissory Bill"
- Commands: 3rd Division (1950–53); 6th Brigade (1948–50); 24th Brigade (1943–45); Maroubra Force (1942); 30th Brigade (1942); 2/31st Battalion (1941–42)
- Conflicts: Second World War; North African Campaign; Syria-Lebanon Campaign; New Guinea Campaign; Kokoda Track Campaign; Huon Peninsula campaign; Borneo Campaign
- Awards: Commander of the Order of the British Empire; Distinguished Service Order; Lieutenant of the Royal Victorian Order; Efficiency Decoration; Mentioned in Despatches
- Other work: Chief Commissioner, Victoria Police (1955–63)

Major General Selwyn Havelock Watson Craig Porter, CBE, DSO, LVO, ED (23 February 1905 – 9 October 1963) was an Australian Army officer and Chief Commissioner of Victoria Police.

== Early life ==
Born on 23 February 1905 in Tintaldra, Victoria, Porter was educated at Wangaratta High School before taking up a position as a clerk in the State Savings Bank of Victoria.

== Military career ==
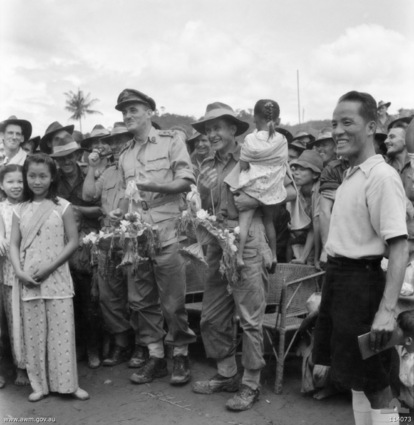
Porter (left in service cap) and other 24th Brigade officers at Beaufort, Borneo in August 1945

Porter began his military career in 1924 when he was commissioned as a lieutenant in the Citizens Military Force, serving with the 58th Battalion. By 1936 he had reached the rank of major. Upon the outbreak of the Second World War, Porter joined the Second Australian Imperial Force that was raised for overseas service and was allocated to the 2/5th Battalion as second in command. Deployed to the Middle East, he temporarily commanded the 2/6th Battalion and led them as the Australians advanced past Derna, for which he was Mentioned in Despatches. Later he was promoted to lieutenant colonel and given full command of the 2/31st Battalion and led them through the Syria-Lebanon Campaign, for which he later received the Distinguished Service Order, before being wounded in the thigh.

He then returned to Australia and was promoted to the temporary rank of brigadier and sent to Port Moresby where he was placed in command of the 30th Brigade, which had been sent there in response to Japan's entry into the war. Following the Japanese landing at Buna, Porter led the 30th Brigade and then during August 1942 temporarily commanded Maroubra Force along the Kokoda Track, before handing over to Brigadier Arnold Potts. He later commanded the 30th Brigade around Sanananda.

In November 1943 Porter took command of the 24th Brigade and led them through the fighting at Finschhafen. In early 1945 he was attached to the 9th Division's planning staff, before leading his brigade during the invasion of North Borneo.

Following the end of the war, Porter returned to Australia and briefly returned to civilian life. In 1947 he was appointed a Commander of the Order of the British Empire. When the Citizens Military Force was re-raised in 1948, Porter was given command of the 6th Brigade and then later promoted to major general in command of the 3rd Division. During 1953–1954 he took up a position on the Military Board as the CMF representative.

== Later life ==
In 1955 he was appointed as chief commissioner of Victoria Police, a post that he held until his death on 9 October 1963 from a coronary occlusion.

Police appointments
Preceded by Alexander Duncan	Chief Commissioner of Victoria Police; 1955–1963	Succeeded by Rupert Arnold
Military offices
Preceded by Major General George Wootten	General Officer Commanding 3rd Division; 1950–1953	Succeeded by Major General Robert Risson
