= 2/28th Battalion (Australia) =

Infantry battalion of the Australian Army

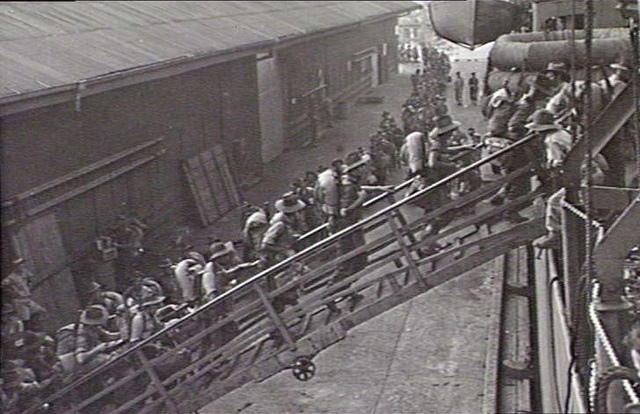
- 2/28th troops board a troopship in Cairns, August 1943, prior to the landing around Lae
- Active: 1940–1946
- Country: Australia
- Branch: Australian Army
- Type: Infantry
- Size: ~800–900 personnel (Note: By the start of World War II, the authorised strength of an Australian infantry battalion was 910 men all ranks, however, later in the war it fell to 803.)
- Part of: 24th Brigade, 9th Division
- Engagements: Second World War: Siege of Tobruk; First Battle of El Alamein; Second Battle of El Alamein; Huon Peninsula campaign; Borneo Campaign

Insignia
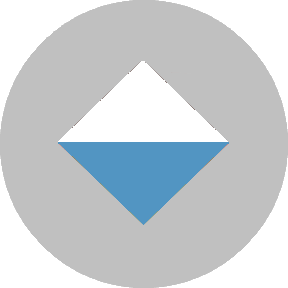
- Unit colour patch (1940–42)

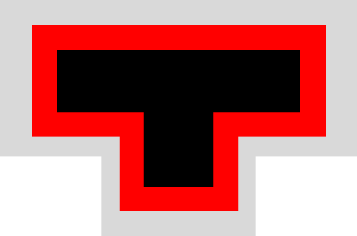
- (1942–46)

The 2/28th Battalion was an infantry battalion of the Australian Army, which served during the Second World War. Formed in mid-1940 from Western Australian volunteers, the battalion served in North Africa in 1941–42 as part of the 24th Brigade, which was assigned to the 9th Division. The battalion's first major engagement came during the Siege of Tobruk, where the battalion carried out defensive duties as part of the garrison for over six months before being withdrawn by sea. After undertaking occupation duties in Syria and Lebanon, the 2/28th took part in the First Battle of El Alamein in mid-1942 during which it was heavily depleted, and had to be rebuilt prior to its commitment to the Second Battle of El Alamein later in the year. In early 1943, the battalion returned to Australia and later took part in campaigns against the Japanese in New Guinea in 1943–44, where it was committed to capturing Lae, and then clearing the Huon Peninsula, and then retaking Borneo in 1945. After the war, the battalion was disbanded in early 1946.

== History ==
=== Formation ===
Raised in Perth, Western Australia, in July 1940 from volunteers for overseas service as part of the Second Australian Imperial Force (2nd AIF), the battalion was allocated to the 24th Brigade, which was initially part of the 8th Division, but later reassigned to the 9th Division. The colours initially chosen for the battalion's unit colour patch (UCP) were the same as those of the 28th Battalion, a unit which had served during the First World War before being raised as a Militia formation in 1921. These colours were white over blue, in a diamond shape, although a border of gray was added to the UCP to distinguish the battalion from its Militia counterpart; this was later changed, though, following the unit's involvement in the fighting at Tobruk, when it adopted a T-shaped UCP.

Shortly after being raised, the battalion's personnel began concentrating at Melville Camp, near Fremantle, on 17 July. With an authorised strength of around 900 personnel, like other Australian infantry battalions of the time, the battalion was formed around a nucleus of four rifle companies – designated 'A' through to 'D' – each consisting of three platoons. Under the command of Lieutenant Colonel John Lloyd, the battalion undertook a period of basic training in Australia to prepare them for combat, before embarking for overseas.

=== Middle East ===
After training in Australia, in January 1941 the battalion was shipped to the Middle East, embarking from Fremantle, to join other elements of the 9th Division that were completing their training. After landing at Port Tewfik, the battalion established a camp at Khassa, north of Gaza, from where it undertook further training in Palestine before deploying to Libya. While the majority of the 9th Division moved into Cyrenaica in March 1941 following the departure of the 6th Division to Greece, the 2/28th, lacking transport, remained in Tobruk, on the border, along with the rest of the 24th Brigade. Following the arrival of German forces in North Africa to reinforce their Italian allies, the British were pushed onto the defensive and they were forced to withdraw from Benghazi to Tobruk, which subsequently fell under siege. There, the 2/28th helped defend the vital port for over six months, alternating between the main defence line and the rear areas, and conducting patrols, before being withdrawn via the sea to Alexandria in late September 1941, and then being moved further back to Palestine for a period of rest.

Throughout early 1942, the 2/28th served in a garrison role in Syria and Lebanon as part of the Allied occupation force that had been established in the French colonies in the aftermath of the short Syria–Lebanon campaign. This was interrupted in mid-1942, as German and Italian forces began advancing towards Egypt, and the 9th Division was hurriedly recalled to help check their progress. As a result, the 2/28th Battalion moved back to the Egypt-Libya border area.

On the night of 26/27 July, during the First Battle of El Alamein, the battalion lost more than 80% of its personnel at the time. These losses were incurred when the 2/28th was tasked with occupying a forward position known to the Allies as "Ruin Ridge"; a hill with a ruined house, south of Sanyet el Miteiriya, Egypt. After taking the position, the 2/28th was cut off and surrounded by German infantry and armour. After it became clear that his force could not be relieved, Lt Col. Lew McCarter surrendered: 489 members of the 2/28th went into captivity, Another 55 were subsequently listed as killed in action at Ruin Ridge. 105 personnel from the battalion had either withdrawn successfully, or had not been directly involved in the operation. They constituted a cadre upon which the battalion could be re-formed, after returning to Palestine. There the 2/28th was joined by volunteers from other battalions of the 9th Division, many of them reportedly also West Australians.

By the end of September, the 2/28th had returned to the front line, and, on 23 October, it was committed to the Second Battle of El Alamein, conducting raids behind German lines before being moved into the main area of operations around a position dubbed the "Saucer" on 31 October. They remained there until being withdrawn in December.

The battalion subsequently concentrated along with the rest of the division in Palestine, around Gaza. In early 1943, the decision was made to bring the 9th Division back to Australia to take part in the fighting against the Japanese in the Pacific, joining the other two 2nd AIF divisions – the 6th and 7th – which had been withdrawn the previous year as the focus of Australian Army operations shifted to the war against Japan. The battalion's casualties during its time in the Middle East amounted to over 60 officers and 1,400 other ranks killed, wounded or captured.

=== Pacific ===
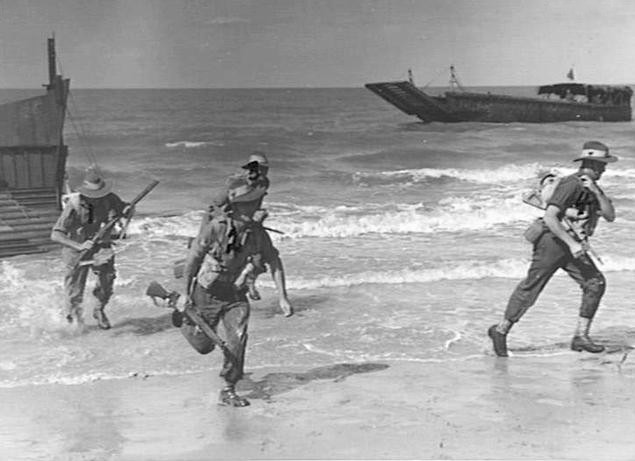
2/28th Battalion personnel exercise at Palm Beach, August 1944

Arriving at Fremantle in February 1943, the battalion was re-organised for jungle operations on the Atherton Tablelands in Queensland; as part of this process, the units of the 9th Division were converted to the jungle divisional establishment, which resulted in the authorised strength of its infantry battalions being reduced to around 800 men. It then subsequently took part in the amphibious landings around Lae in September 1943, landing to the east of the objective and leading the Australian advance across the Busu River. During the advance, the battalion carried out a forced crossing of the Busu under heavy Japanese fire, during which 13 men were swept away in the rain flooded waters. After the capture of Lae, which fell more quickly than the Allied planners had expected, the battalion took part in the Huon Peninsula campaign that followed as the Australians followed up the Japanese forces that were withdrawing north. During this time, the 2/28th took part in actions around Finschhafen, Gusika and Wareo before returning to Australia in January 1944.

The battalion undertook training on the Atherton Tablelands for the next year, before taking part in one of the final Australian campaigns of the war when they landed on Labuan Island. After taking part in the initial landings on 10 June, they advanced north coming up against stiff Japanese resistance around an area called the "Pocket", which was eventually cleared on 21 June. The battalion then re-embarked and was landed to the north of Brunei Bay, and advanced towards Beaufort, where they played a support role during the 24th Brigade's attack on Beaufort on 26–28 June, before helping to secure the eastern approaches to the vital rail junction through patrol actions towards Lumadan. The battalion was still in the Beaufort area when the war ended in August. Following this it undertook garrison duties around Jesselton; the battalion's strength dwindled slowly as personnel were returned to Australia for demobilisation or were transferred to other units for subsequent service. The battalion was finally disbanded in January 1946.

During its involvement in the war, a total of 3,153 men served with the 2/28th Battalion of whom 274 were killed and 511 wounded, while 480 were captured. Members of the battalion received the following decorations: two Distinguished Service Orders, six Military Crosses, four Distinguished Conduct Medals, 15 Military Medals and 51 Mentions in Despatches.

== Battle honours ==
The 2/28th Battalion received the following battle honours:

- Tell el Makh Khad, Sanyet el Miteirya, Qattara Track, Busu River, Siki Cove, Gusika, Labuan, Beaufort, Defence of Tobruk, Defence of Alamein Line, El Alamein, South-West Pacific 1943–45, Lae–Nadzab, Finschhafen, Defence of Scarlet Beach, Borneo, and North Africa 1941–42.

In 1961, these battle honours were entrusted to the 28th Battalion, and through this link are maintained by the Royal Western Australia Regiment.

== Commanding officers ==
The following officers served as commanding officer of the 2/28th:

- Lieutenant Colonel John Edward Lloyd (1940–42);
- Lieutenant Colonel Lewis McCarter (1942);
- Lieutenant Colonel Jack Loughrey (1942–43);
- Lieutenant Colonel Colin Hugh Boyd Norman (1943–45); and
- Lieutenant Colonel James Gordon Hendry (1945).

== Notes ==
Footnotes

Citations
