= Weston, Sabah =

Weston
- Town
- Pekan Weston

Other transcription(s)
  - Jawi: ويستن
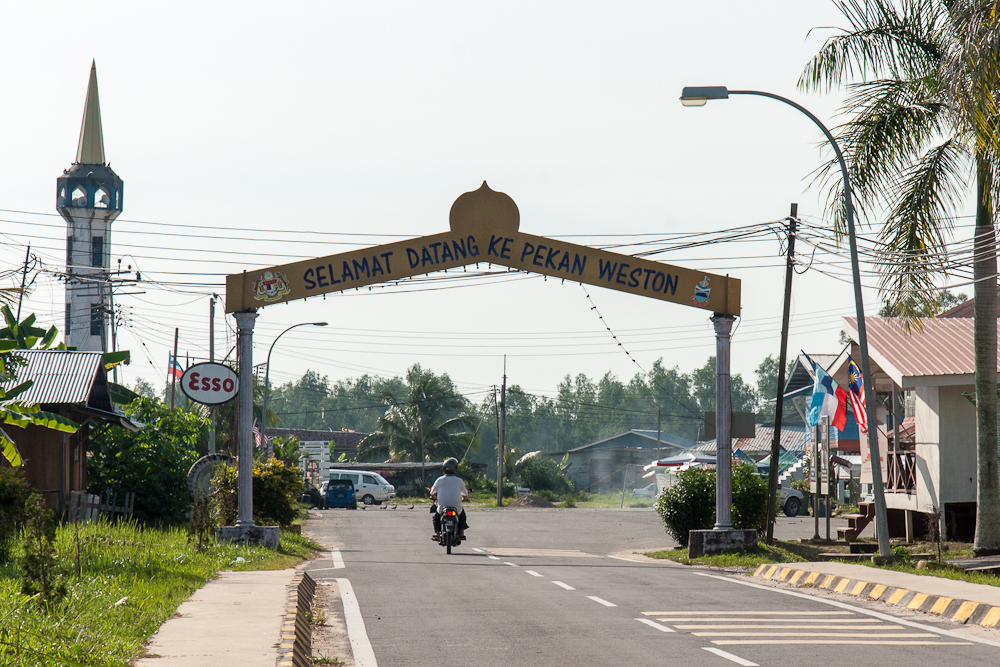
- The main gate to Weston town.

- Location within Sabah Location within Malaysia
- Coordinates: 5°12′59″N 115°35′39″E
- Country: Malaysia
- State: Sabah
- Division: Interior
- District: Beaufort

Population (2024)
  - Total: 680

Weston is a small town located on the west coast of the Malaysian state of Sabah, about 100 kilometers south of Kota Kinabalu, the state capital. Weston is part of the Beaufort District in the Interior Division and was named after Arthur J. West, a railway engineer for the North Borneo Chartered Company. Weston is one of the towns along the Pan Borneo Highway.

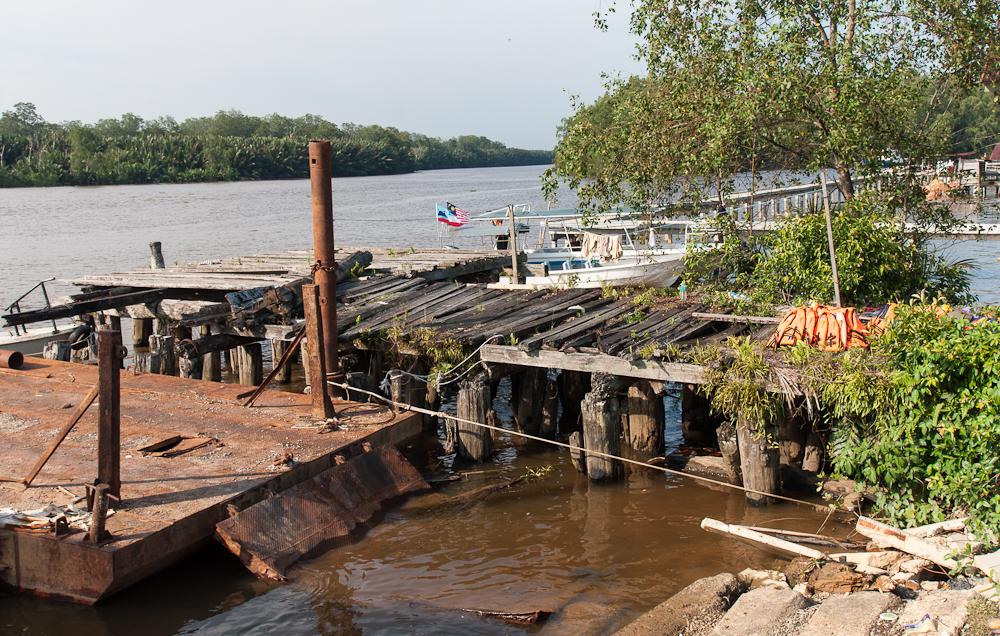
Remains of the jetty that was the terminus of the North Borneo Railway

== History ==
The original name of the settlement was Sugin Lawas. When the North Borneo Chartered Company commissioned the town as the terminus of the North Borneo Railway to Beaufort, it was renamed West Town in honor of the railway engineer Arthur J. West, which later changed the current name, Weston.

When the first railway section was built in the 1890s, William Clarke Cowie had chosen the location at the mouth of the Padas River as a seemingly suitable port for the shipping of natural rubber and tobacco. However, it soon became clear that the harbour was too shallow for larger ships. Weston's importance faded when the railway line was extended to Jesselton in 1906.

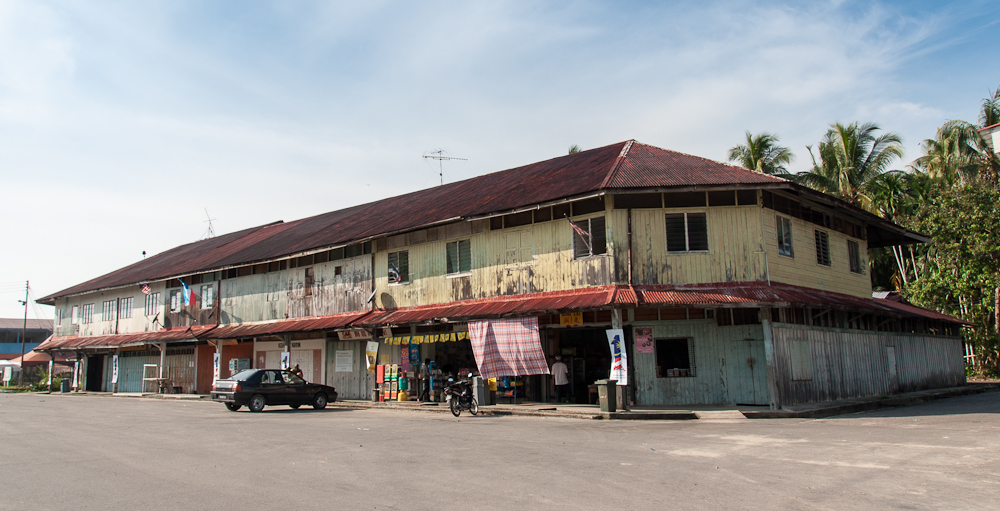
Shophouses in Weston.

Weston was one of the ports used by the Japanese Army in the invasion of North Borneo. From Weston, the Japanese troops first moved towards Beaufort and from there, transported part of their troops by railway to Jesselton, which was occupied by the Japanese from 6 January 1941. Weston was also one of the starting points for the liberation of North Borneo for the Australian 9th Division. On 19 June 1945, Weston was captured by Allied troops.

When the Brunei Revolt broke out in Brunei on 8 December 1962, the rebellion quickly spread across the border to Limbang, Lawas and Miri in Sarawak and Weston and Sipitang in North Borneo, as these places were traditionally associated with the Sultanate. Thanks to the quick and decisive intervention of the British governor, Sir William Goode, the rebels in Sipitang and Weston were isolated and disarmed just two days later. On 10 December, a total of 60 rebels were arrested in Weston and a large amount of weapons were confiscated.

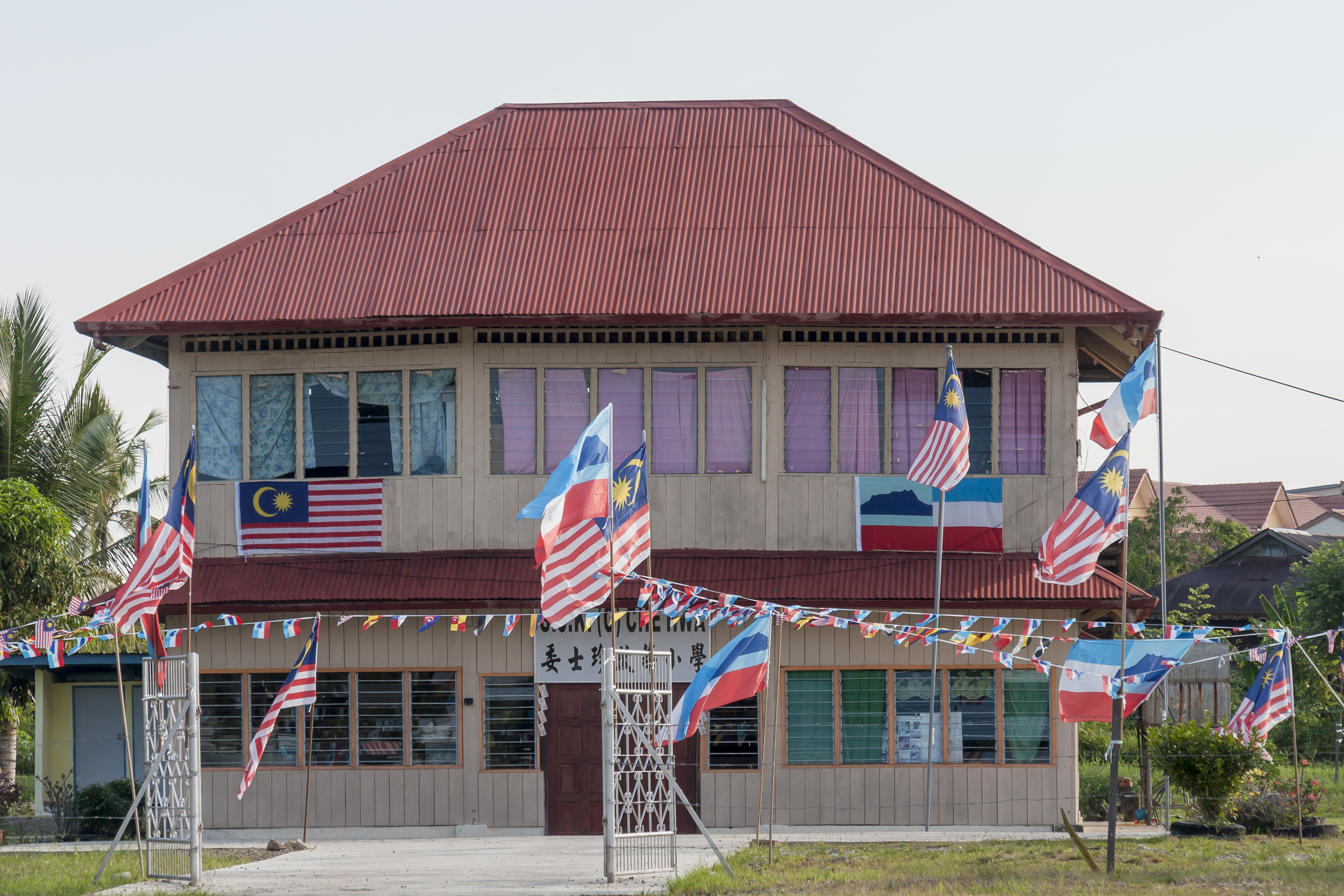
A historic school building.

Train service between Beaufort and Weston was finally closed in 1963.

== Historical buildings ==
Weston is one of the cities along the west coast whose historic buildings have disappeared, with a few exceptions. The following buildings have been preserved from the time before the Second World War:

- A row of shophouse,
- Sekolah Cina Che Hwa, a vernacular Chinese school, built in 1932
- the jetty where the first section of the North Borneo Railway ended

== Demographics ==
According to population statistics in 2024, the city has 680 inhabitants, mostly Malays (75%). The remaining residents of Weston, which is around 1,700 people, are spread across the surrounding villages and settlements.

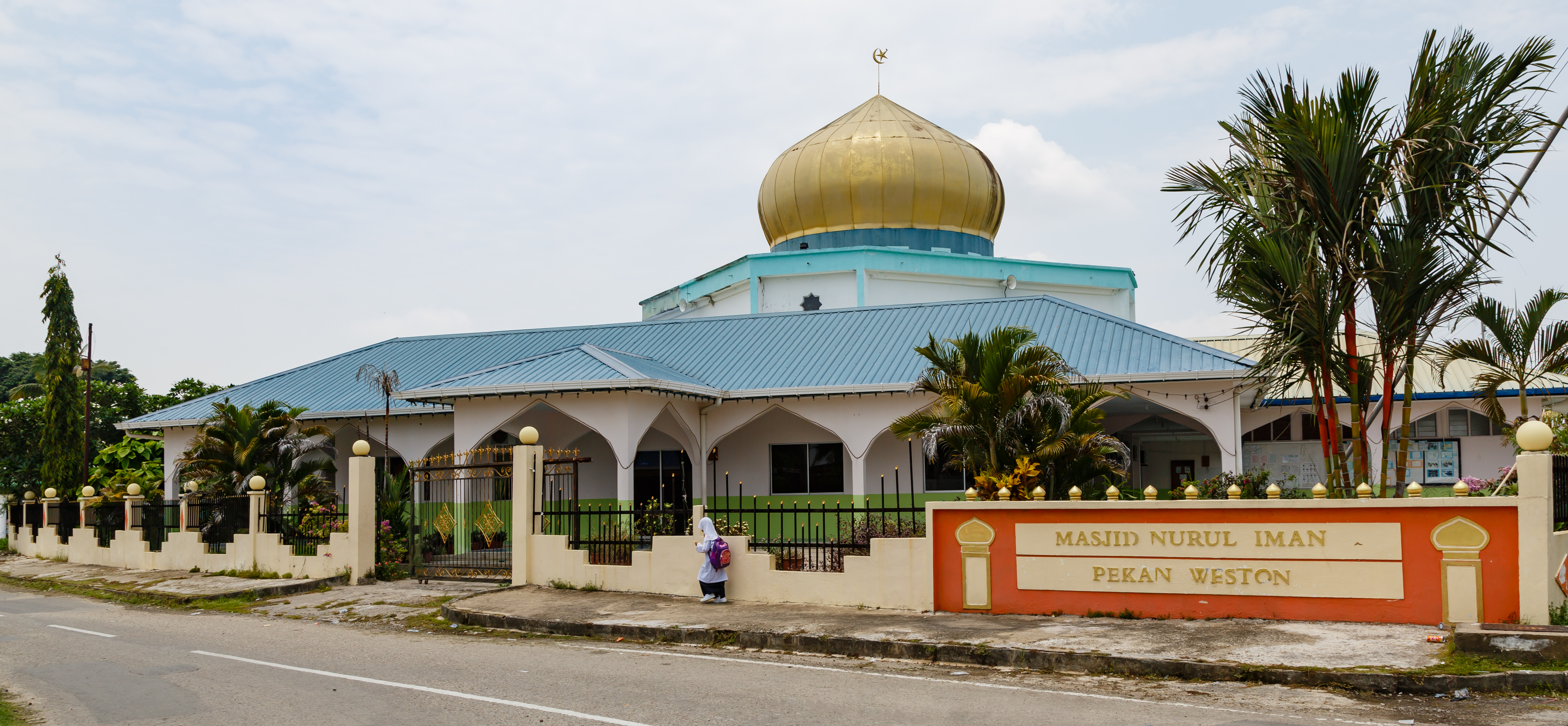
Masjid Nurul Iman, a mosque in Weston.

== Flora and fauna ==
Parts of the Padas River estuary are protected as Weston Wetland Park (WWP). The wetland is one of the largest estuarine habitats in the northern part of Borneo. The wetland biotope is a retreat area for proboscis monkeys.

== Literature ==
- K. G. Tregonning: A History of Modern Sabah (North Borneo 1881–1963). 2. Ausgabe. University of Malaya Press, Kuala Lumpur 1965, Reprint 1967.
- Owen Rutter: British North Borneo – An Account of its History, Ressources and Native Tribes. Constable & Company, London 1922; Weston, Sabah at the Internet Archive.
- W. H. Treacher: British Borneo – Sketches of Brunai, Sarawak, Labuan and North Borneo. Government print department, Singapore 1891; Weston, Sabah at the Internet Archive.
