= Borneo campaign (1945) order of battle =

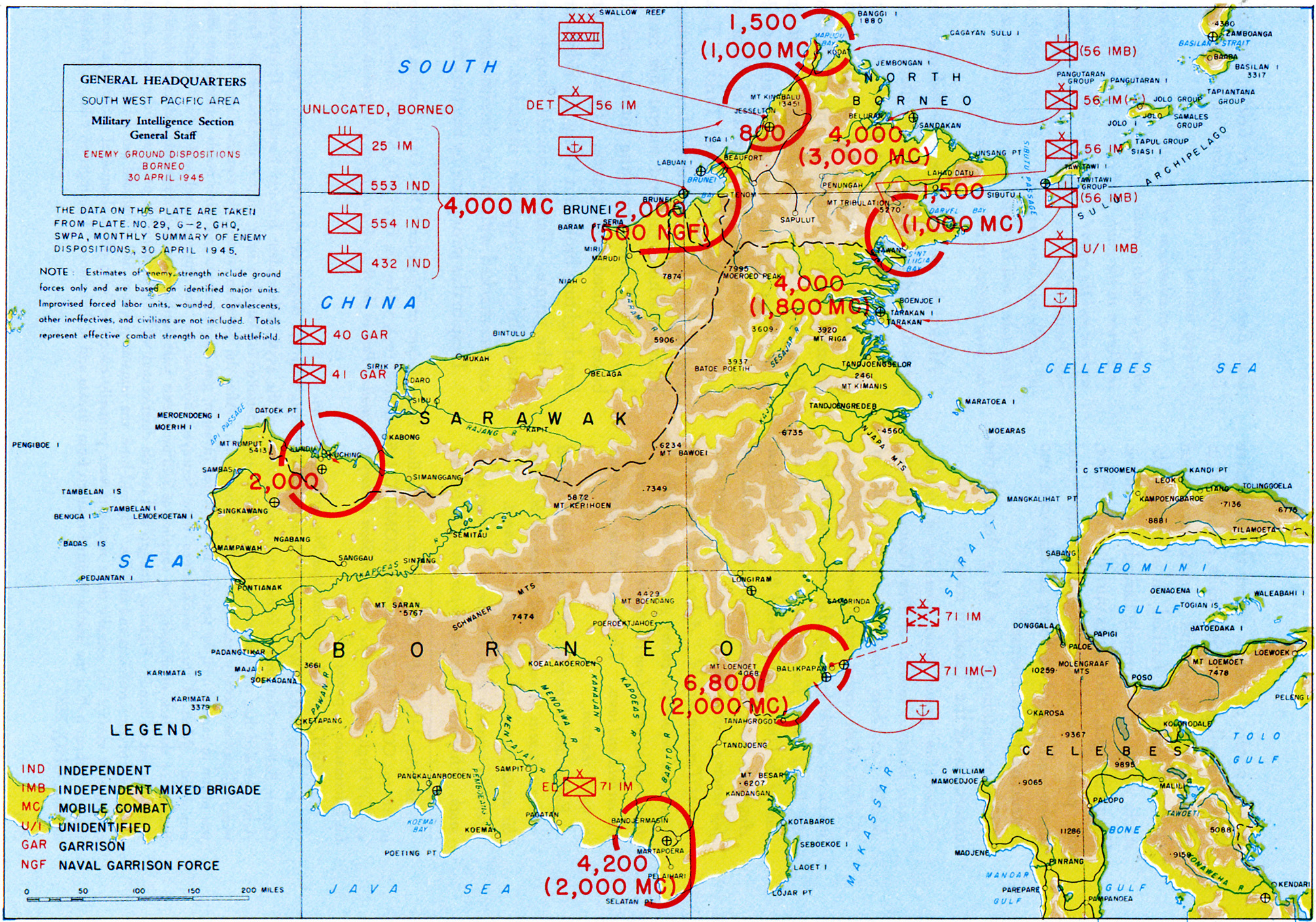
An Allied estimate of Japanese units in Borneo at the end of April 1945

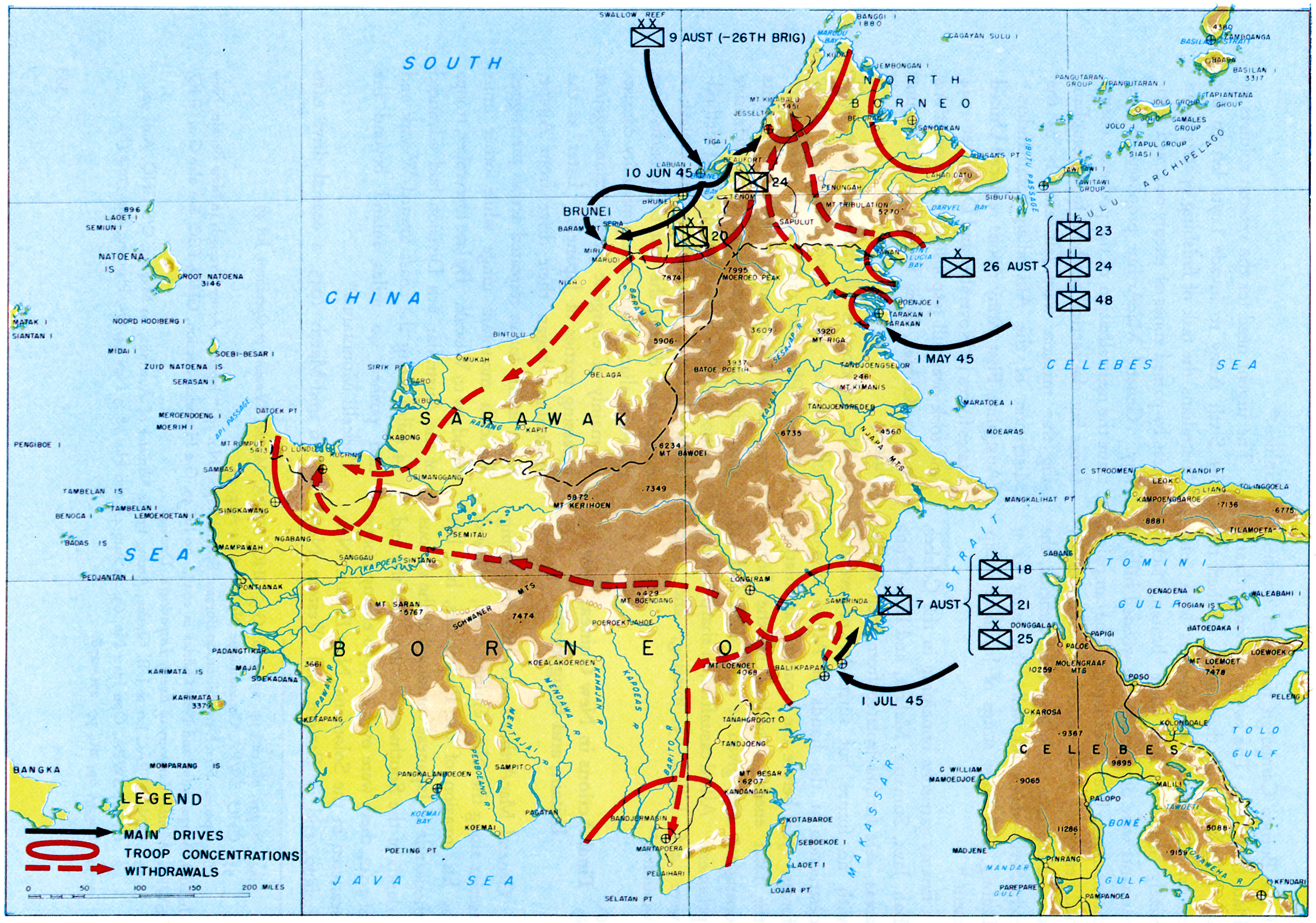
A map showing the progress of the Borneo campaign

Opposing theatre commanders

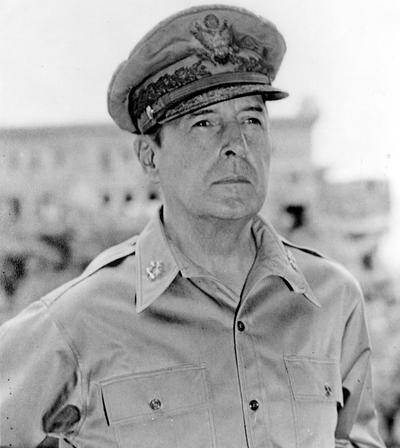
Gen. Douglas MacArthur

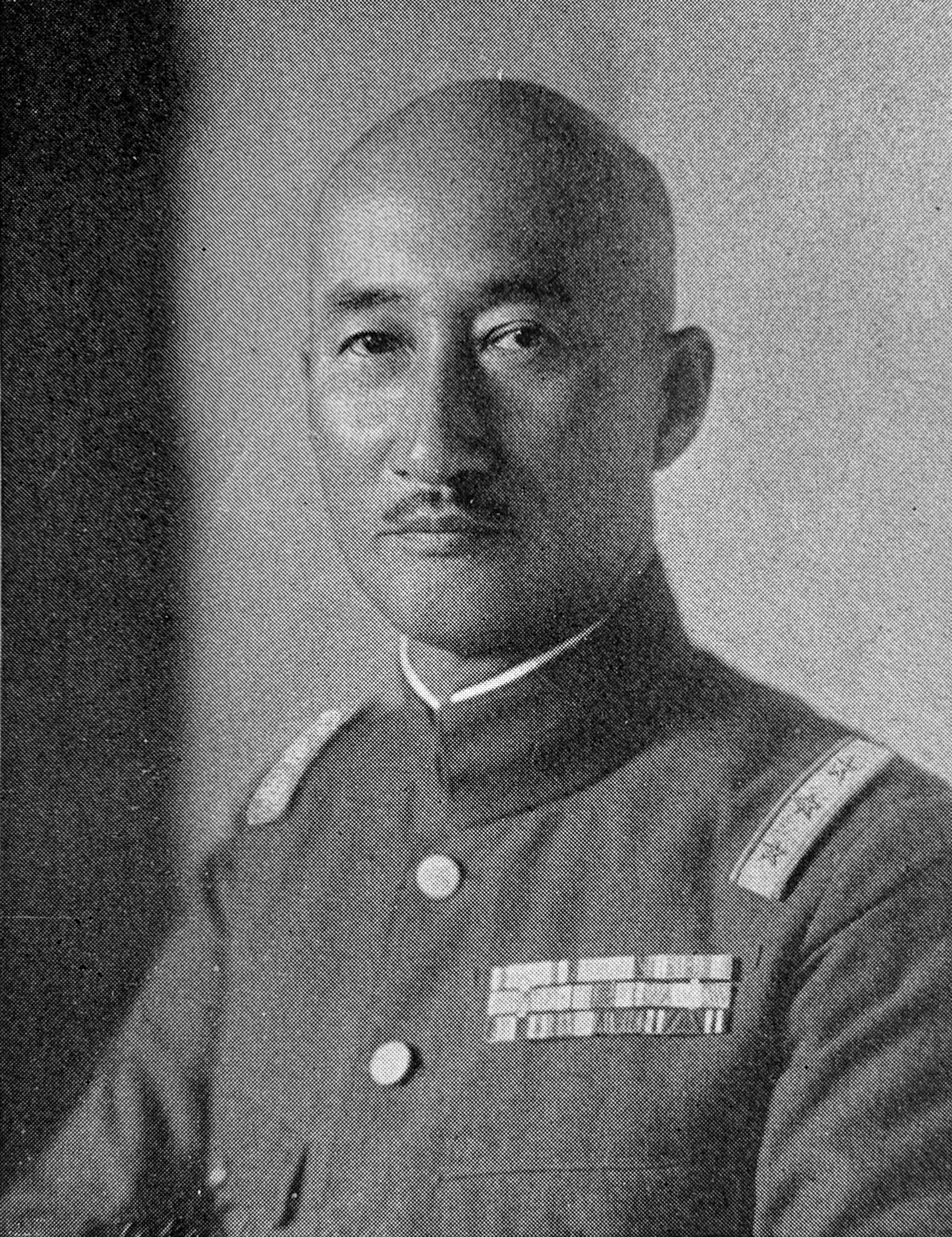
Count Hisaichi Terauchi

Allied ground force commanders on Borneo

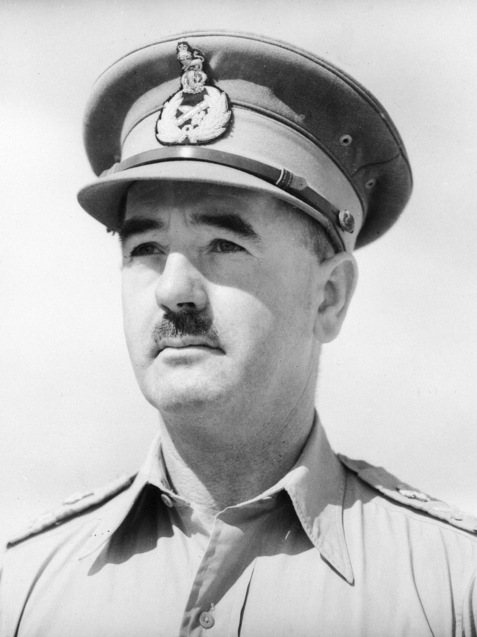
Lieut-Gen Leslie Morshead

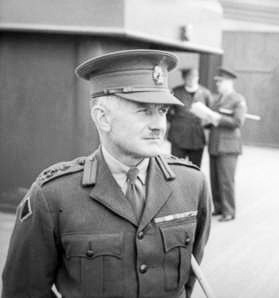
Major-Gen Edward Milford

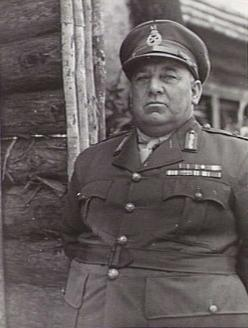
Major-Gen George Wootten

This is the complete order of battle of Allied and Japanese forces during the Borneo campaign of 1945. As the campaign was fought in three geographically separate areas and the same air and naval units supported more than one of these battles the order of battle is split into the three areas.

As it turned out these operations were different from those that had gone before. The minefields were heavier and, for the first time in any Pacific campaign, man-made obstacles had been laid off the beaches.

— Daniel E. Barbey (USN, ret.), MacArthur's Amphibious Navy (1969), p. 314

== Summary order of battle ==
=== Allied forces ===
General Headquarters South West Pacific Area
General Douglas MacArthur

Ground Forces

Australian I Corps (Lieutenant-Gen Leslie Morshead)

Australian 7th Division (Major-Gen Edward Milford)
Australian 9th Division (Major-Gen George Wootten)

Air Forces

Advanced RAAF Command

Australian First Tactical Air Force
United States Thirteenth Air Force

Naval Forces

US Seventh Fleet (Admiral Thomas C. Kinkaid)

Amphibious Force (Vice Admiral Daniel E. Barbey)

=== Japanese forces ===
Southern Expeditionary Army Group (HQ at Saigon)
Count Hisaichi Terauchi

Seventh Area Army (Note: A Japanese area army was equivalent to a Euro-American army.)

Thirty-Seventh Army (Note: A Japanese army was equivalent to a Euro-American corps.)
Lieutenant General Masao Baba

North

Army-Navy Headquarters Tarakan
56th Independent Mixed Brigade (Brunei)
25th Independent Mixed Regiment (North Borneo)
553rd Independent Infantry Battalion (Miri)
554th Independent Infantry Battalion (Sandakan)
774th Independent Infantry Battalion (Tenom)

South

71st Independent Mixed Brigade (Kuching)
455th Independent Infantry Battalion (Balikpapan)
22nd Special Naval Base Force (Balikpapan)

Third Air Army (Singapore)

Japanese 10th Independent Flying Brigade

83rd Flying Regiment

== Tarakan (May - June 1945) ==
=== Allied units ("Oboe One Force") ===
==== Ground forces ====
26th Brigade Group (Note: Detached from 9th Division)
Brigadier David Whitehead
Approx. 18,100 troops

2/23rd Infantry Battalion
2/24th Infantry Battalion
2/48th Infantry Battalion
2/3rd Pioneer Battalion (fought as infantry)
2/4th Cavalry Commando Squadron
C Squadron, 2/9th Armoured Regiment (Matilda II tanks)
D Company, 2/2nd Machine Gun Battalion
2/7th Field Regiment (25 pounder guns)
53rd Composite Anti-Aircraft Regiment
2/13th Field Company
2nd Field Company
2/12th Field Ambulance

2 Beach Group

2/2nd Pioneer Battalion
Other units

2/11th Field Company
2 Beach Workshop
'B' Royal Australian Navy Commando
2nd Australian Army Medical Corps Company

Royal Netherlands East Indies Army

2nd Company, 1st Battalion Netherlands East Indies Army

United States Army

Composite Company, 727th Amphibian Tractor Battalion
Company, 593rd Engineer Boat and Shore Battalion

==== Air units ====
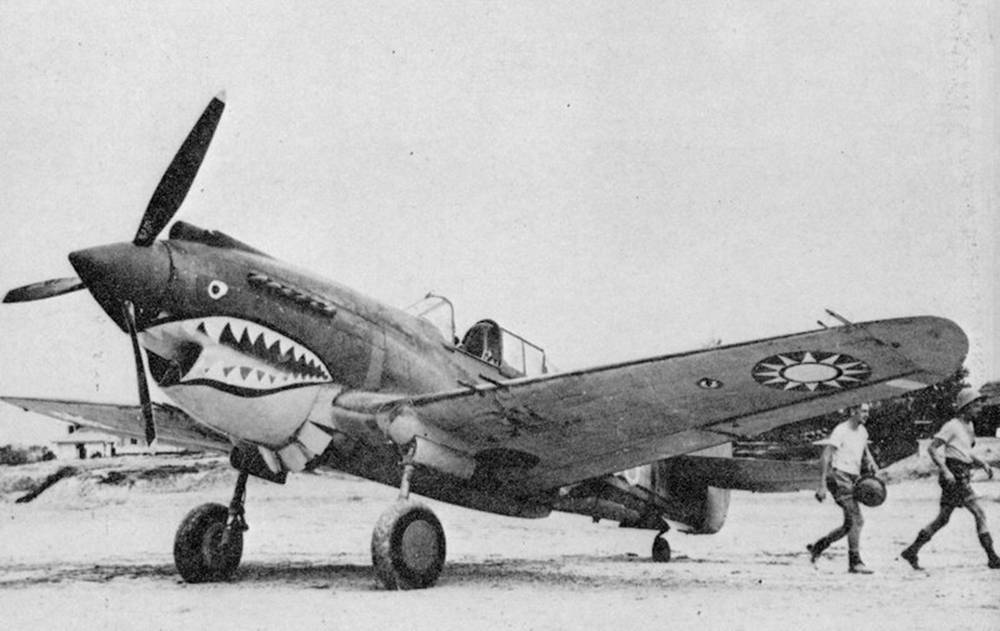
Curtiss P-40 Kittyhawk

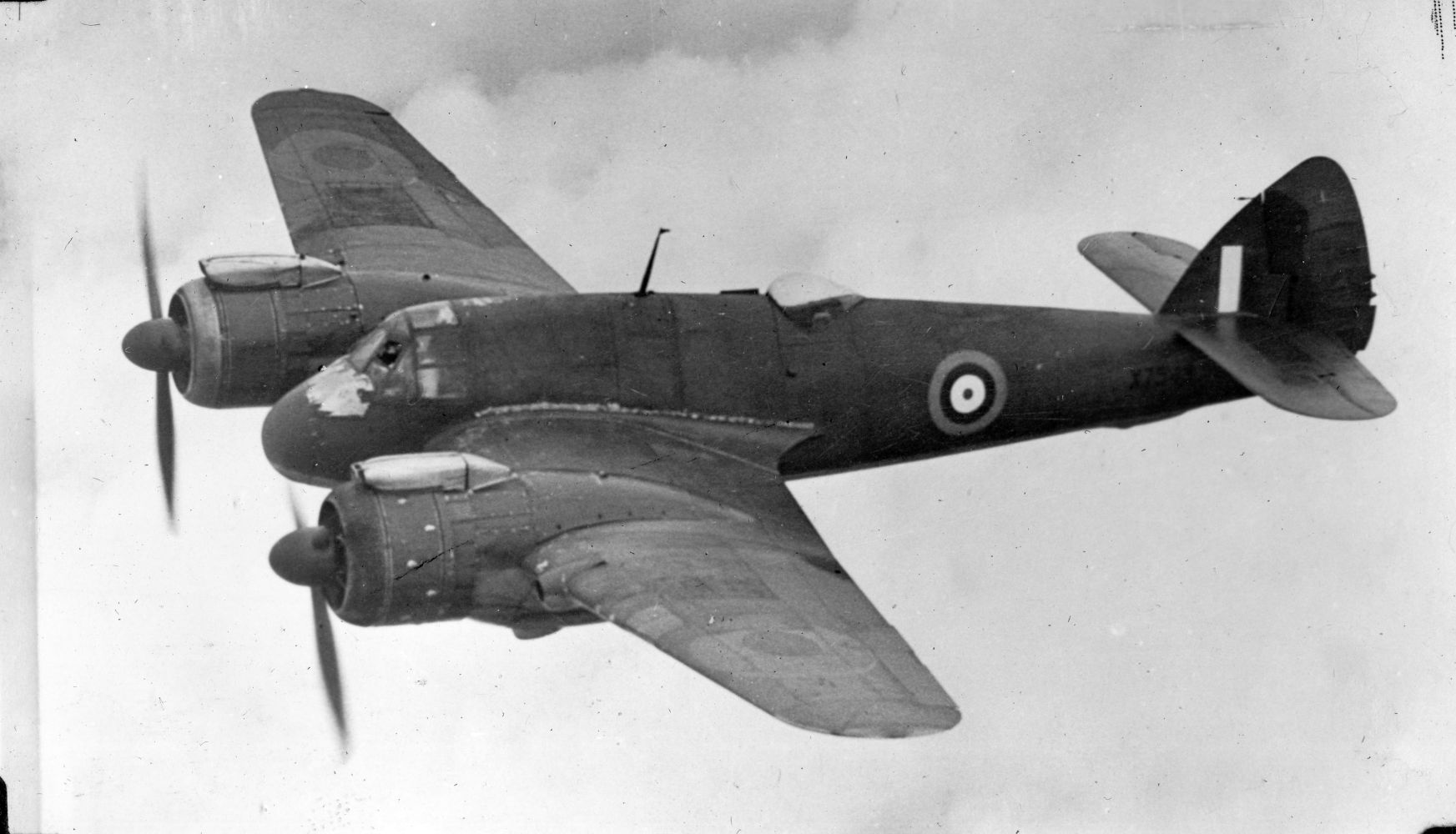
Bristol Beaufighter

Royal Australian Air Force

No. 77 (Attack) Wing Royal Australian Air Force (RAAF)

No. 76 Squadron RAAF (Curtiss P-40 Kittyhawk) (from 15 May)
No. 22 Squadron RAAF (Bristol Beaufighter) (from 4 June)
No. 30 Squadron RAAF (Bristol Beaufighter) (from 4 June)
No. 31 Squadron RAAF (Bristol Beaufighter)

No. 78 (Fighter) Wing RAAF

No. 75 Squadron RAAF (Curtiss P-40 Kittyhawk)
No. 78 Squadron RAAF (Curtiss P-40 Kittyhawk)
No. 80 Squadron RAAF (Curtiss P-40 Kittyhawk)
No. 452 Squadron RAAF (Supermarine Spitfire)

No. 82 (Bomber) Wing RAAF

No. 21 Squadron RAAF (Consolidated B-24 Liberator)
No. 23 Squadron RAAF (Consolidated B-24 Liberator)
No. 24 Squadron RAAF (Consolidated B-24 Liberator)

RAAF ground units on Tarakan during the campaign

No. 16 Air Observation Post Flight (4 Auster light aircraft)
No. 61 Operational Base Unit
No. 61 Airfield Construction Wing

No. 1 Airfield Construction Squadron
No. 8 Airfield Construction Squadron

No. 2 Aerodrome Security Squadron
No. 114 Mobile Fighter Control Unit

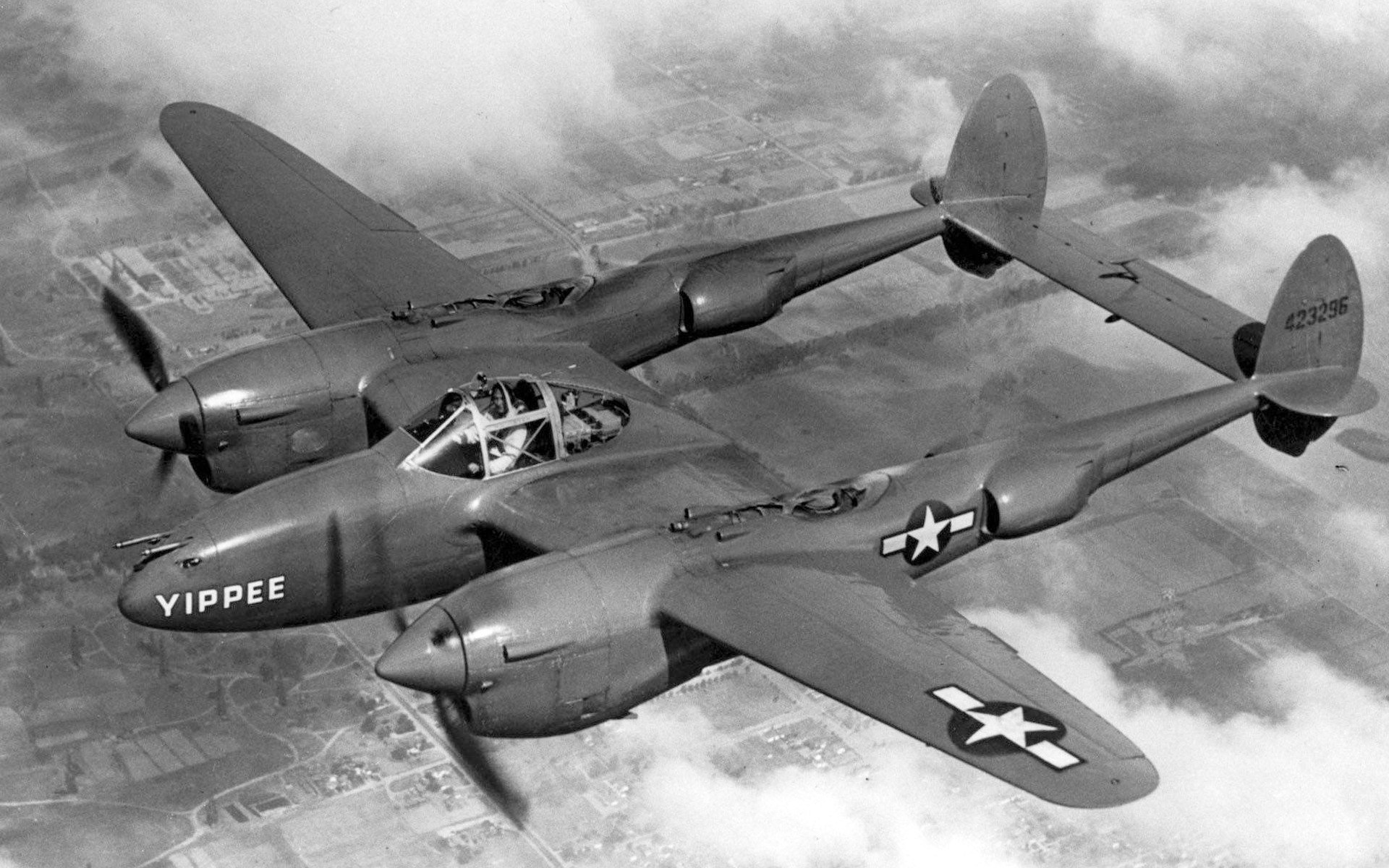
Lockheed P-38 Lightning

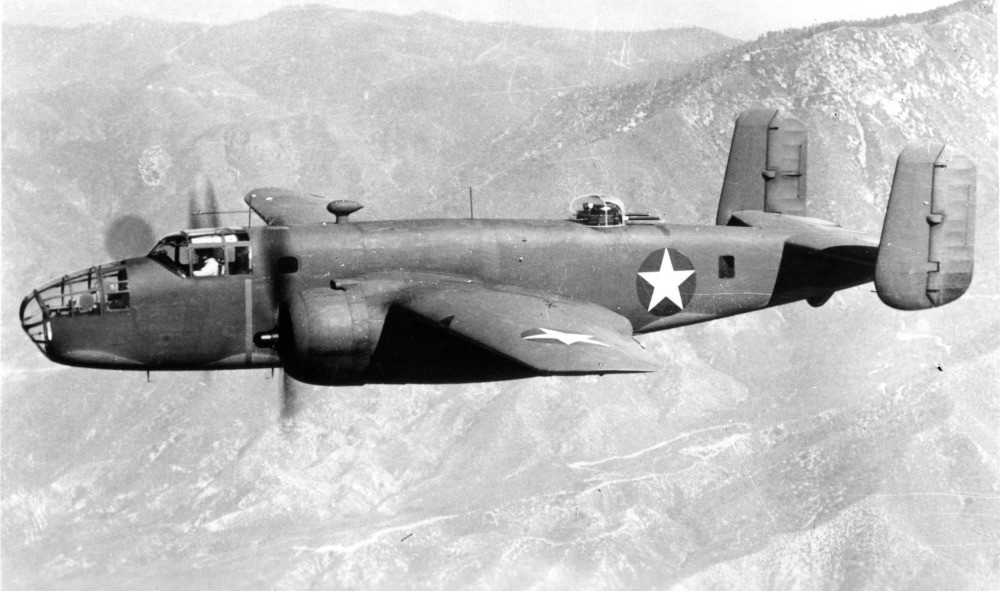
North American B-25 Mitchell

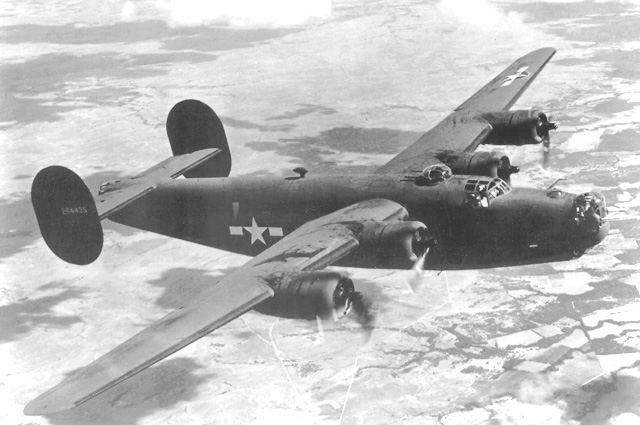
Consolidated B-24 Liberator

United States Army Air Forces

18th Fighter Group USAAF (Mindoro Island, Zamboanga from 4 May)

12th Fighter Squadron (Lockheed P-38 Lightning)
44th Fighter Squadron (Lockheed P-38 Lightning)
70th Fighter Squadron (Lockheed P-38 Lightning)

347th Fighter Group USAAF (Palawan Island)

67th Fighter Squadron (Lockheed P-38 Lightning)
68th Fighter Squadron (Lockheed P-38 Lightning)
339th Fighter Squadron (Lockheed P-38 Lightning)

42d Bombardment Group USAAF (Palawan Island)

69th Bombardment Squadron (North American B-25 Mitchell)
70th Bombardment Squadron (North American B-25 Mitchell)
75th Bombardment Squadron (North American B-25 Mitchell)
100th Bombardment Squadron (North American B-25 Mitchell)
390th Bombardment Squadron (North American B-25 Mitchell)

5th Bombardment Group USAAF (Samar Island)

23d Bombardment Squadron (Consolidated B-24 Liberator)
31st Bombardment Squadron (Consolidated B-24 Liberator)
72d Bombardment Squadron (Consolidated B-24 Liberator)
394th Bombardment Squadron (Consolidated B-24 Liberator)

307th Bombardment Group USAAF (Morotai Island)

370th Bombardment Squadron (Consolidated B-24 Liberator)
371st Bombardment Squadron (Consolidated B-24 Liberator)
372nd Bombardment Squadron (Consolidated B-24 Liberator)
424th Bombardment Squadron (Consolidated B-24 Liberator)

868th Bombardment Squadron USAAF (LA Consolidated B-24 Liberator)
Fleet Air Wing 17 US Navy (Palawan Island)

Patrol Bombing Squadron 128 (VPB-128) (PV-1 Ventura)
Patrol Bombing Squadron 106 (VPB-106) (PB4Y-2 Privateer) (from 3 May)
Patrol Bombing Squadron 111 (VPB-111) (PB4Y-2 Privateer)
Patrol Bombing Squadron 109 (VPB-109) (PB4Y-2 Privateer with Bat Bombs) (until 6 May)

==== Naval units ====
Rear Admiral Forrest B. Royal, USN (Note: Died of a heart attack aboard his flagship 18 June 1945)

Covering Group 74.3

3 light cruisers

2 Brooklyn-class (15 × 6-in. main battery): Phoenix, Boise
1 Leander-class (8 × 6-in. main battery): HMAS Hobart

6 destroyers

5 Fletcher-class (5 × 5-in. main battery): Fletcher, Jenkins, Nicholas, O'Bannon, Taylor
1 Tribal-class (6 × 4.7-in. main battery): HMAS Warramunga

Attack Group 78.1

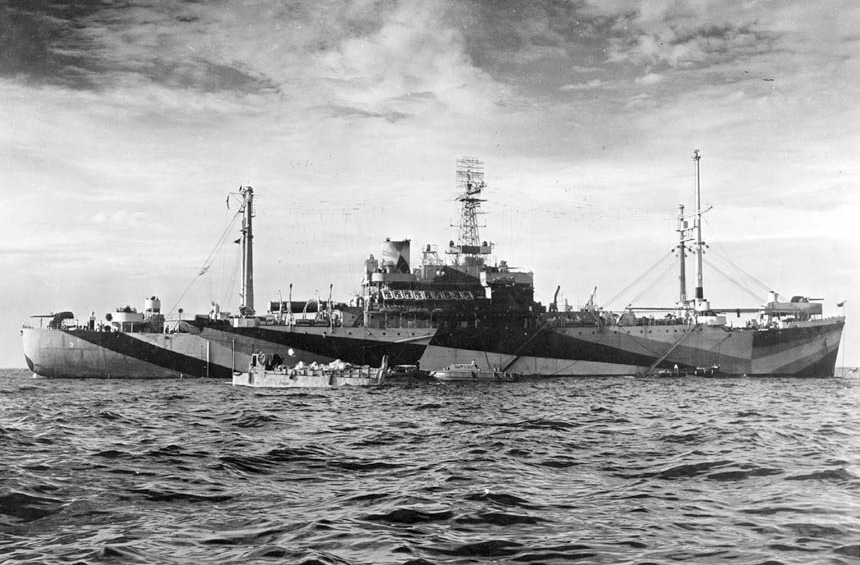
Amphibious command ship Rocky Mount

1 amphibious command ship: Rocky Mount
2 LSI: HMAS Manoora, HMAS Westralia
1 attack cargo: Titania
1 LSD: Rushmore
21 LST, 12 LCI, 4 LSM, 12 LCT
Support

6 LCS, 4 LCI(R), 2 LCI(M), 2 LCI(D) with four demolition units

Screen

7 destroyers

2 Fletcher-class (5 × 5-in. main battery): Waller, Philip
2 Mahan-class (4 × 5-in. main battery): Drayton, Smith
3 Benson-class (4 × 5-in. main battery): Bailey, Bancroft, Caldwell

2 John C. Butler-class destroyer escorts (2 × 5-in. main battery): Formoe, Charles E. Brannon
3 frigates

HMAS Burdekin, HMAS Barcoo, HMAS Hawkesbury

1 motor torpedo boat (MTB) tender: Wachapreague, 21 MTBs

Landing craft control unit: 1 PC, 1 LCI(L), 2 LCS
Minesweeping unit: 1 APD, 11 YMS
Service unit: 1 AGS, 1 AN, 1 ATR, 1 ATO, 4 LCI(L) equipped for fire fighting and salvage

=== Japanese units ===
Army-Navy Headquarters

455th Independent Infantry Battalion

1 Company
2 Company
3 Company
4 Company
Machine Gun Company

2nd Naval Guard Force

1 Company
2 Company
Air Defence Unit

== Balikpapan (July 1945) ==
=== Allied units ("Oboe Two Force") ===
==== Ground forces ====
Australian 7th Division
Major General Edward Milford
Approx 33,000 troops

Divisional Units

2/7 Cavalry (Commando) Regiment
2/1 Pioneer Battalion
2/1 Machine Gun Battalion
B Company 2/1 Guard Regiment (4 platoons)

Divisional Artillery

2/4 Field Regiment (Ordnance QF 25 pounder gun-howitzers)
2/5 Field Regiment (25 pounder guns)
2/6 Field Regiment (25 pounder guns)
2/2 Tank Attack Regiment

Divisional Engineers

2/4 Field Company
2/5 Field Company
2/6 Field Company
2/9 Field Company
2/25 Field Park Company

18 Infantry Brigade

2/9 Battalion
2/10 Battalion
2/12 Battalion

21 Infantry Brigade

2/14 Battalion
2/16th Battalion
2/27 Battalion

25 Infantry Brigade

2/25 Battalion
2/31 Battalion
2/33 Battalion

I Australian Corps units (Note: Attached to 7th Division for operational purposes)

1st Armoured Regiment (Matilda II tanks)
Armoured Squadron (Special Equipment) (Matilda tank specialist variant)
2/1 Composite Anti-Aircraft Regiment
2 Beach Group

2/2 Pioneer Battalion

2/11 Field Company

12 Aust. Light Wireless Section

Royal Netherlands East Indies Army

1 Company, 1 NEI Battalion

United States Army

727th Amphibian Tractor Battalion (less one company)
One company, 672nd Amphibian Tractor Battalion
One boat company, Boat Battalion, 593rd Engineer Boat and Shore Regiment

==== Air units ====
Royal Australian Air Force

79 (General Reconnaissance – Bomber) Wing Royal Australian Air Force (RAAF)

No. 2 Squadron RAAF (North American B-25 Mitchell)
No. 18 (Netherlands East Indies) Squadron (North American B-25 Mitchell)

78 (Fighter) Wing RAAF (from June 30)

No. 75 Squadron (Curtiss P-40 Kittyhawk)
No. 78 Squadron (Curtiss P-40 Kittyhawk)
No. 80 Squadron (Curtiss P-40 Kittyhawk)
No. 452 Squadron (Supermarine Spitfire)

82 (Bomber) Wing RAAF

No. 21 Squadron (Consolidated B-24 Liberator)
No. 23 Squadron (Consolidated B-24 Liberator)
No. 24 Squadron (Consolidated B-24 Liberator)

Detachment, 83 (Army Co-Operation) Wing

Detachment, No. 4 Squadron (CAC Boomerang)
Detachment, No. 16 Air Observation Post Flight

Detachment, No. 9 Local Air Supply Unit RAAF
No. 54 Squadron RAF (Supermarine Spitfire)

United States Army Air Forces

13th Air Force

42nd Bombardment Group (North American B-25 Mitchell)

69, 70, 75, 100, 390 Bombardment Squadrons (Palawan Island)

5th Bombardment Group (Consolidated B-24 Liberator)

23, 31, 72, 394 Bombardment Squadrons (Samar Island)

307th Bombardment Group (Consolidated B-24 Liberator)

370, 371, 372, 424 Bombardment Squadrons (Morotai Island)

868th Bombardment Squadron (Consolidated SB-24 Liberator, LAB: Low Altitude radar Bomb.) flew maritime surveillance patrols
18th Fighter Group (Lockheed P-38 Lightning)

67, 68, 339 Fighter Squadrons (Palawan Island)

419th Night Fighter Squadron (Northrop P-61 Black Widow) (Zamboanga and Palawan)
4 Reconnaissance Group (Lockheed F-5 Lightning and North American B-25 Mitchell)

17th Photographic Reconnaissance Squadron Det. (Palawan Island)

5th Air Force

22nd Bombardment Group (Consolidated B-24 Liberator)
38th Bombardment Group (North American B-25 Mitchell)

Attached to 42nd Bombardment Group

90th Bombardment Group (Consolidated B-24 Liberator)
380th Bombardment Group (Consolidated B-24 Liberator)

United States Marine Corps

VMB-611 (North American PBJ Mitchell) flying from Zamboanga
Marine Air Group 2 (flying from the USN escort carriers)

Marine Escort Carrier Group 1 (MCVEG-1) on USS Block Island (CVE-106)

VMF-511 (Goodyear FG-1D Corsair & Grumman F6F-5N Hellcat)
VMTB-233 (Grumman TBM-3 Avenger)

Marine Escort Carrier Group 2 (MCVEG-2) on carrier USS Gilbert Islands (CVE-107)

VMF-512 (Goodyear FG-1D Corsair)
VMTB-143 (Grumman TBM-3 Avenger)

United States Navy

Fleet Air Wing 17 (Palawan Island)

Patrol Bombing Squadron 128 (VPB-128) (Lockheed PV-1 Ventura)
Patrol Bombing Squadron 106 (VPB-106) (Consolidated PB4Y-2 Privateer)
Patrol Bombing Squadron 111 (VPB-111) (Consolidated PB4Y-2 Privateer)

Navy Escort Carrier Group 40 (CVEG-40) on carrier USS Suwannee (CVE-27)

Fighter Squadron 40 (VF-40) (Grumman F6F-5 Hellcat)
Torpedo Squadron 40 (VT-40) (Grumman TBM-3 Avenger)

==== Naval forces ====
Rear Admiral Albert G. Noble, USN

Attack Group (Task Group 78.2)

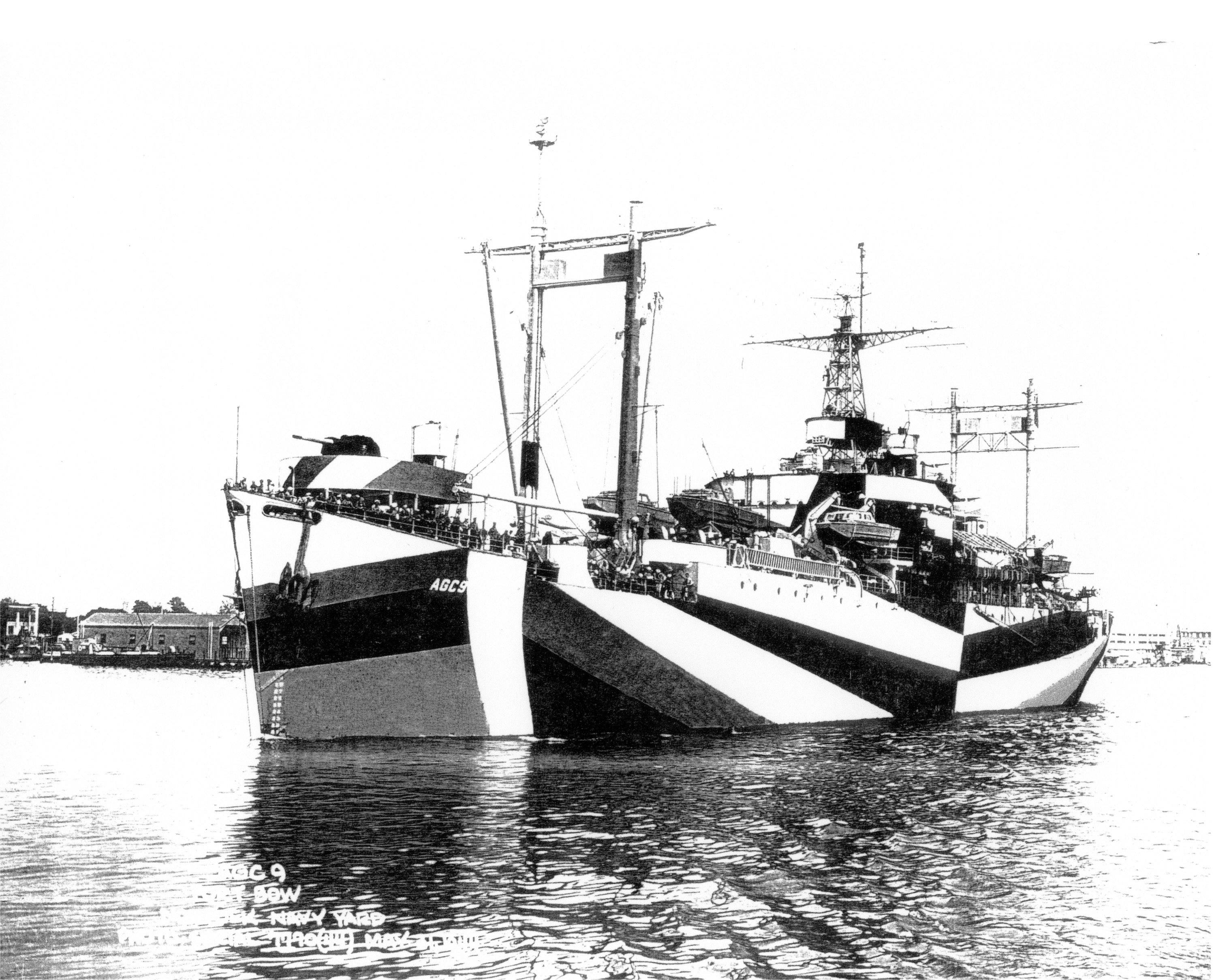
Amphibious command ship Wasatch

Transports

1 amphibious command ship: Wasatch
1 Coast Guard cutter
3 LSI: HMAS Manoora, HMAS Westralia, HMAS Kanimbla
1 attack cargo: Titania
1 LSD: Carter Hall
5 APD: Newman, Liddle, Kephart, Lloyd, Diachenko
Landing craft: 1 LCF(F), 22 LSM, 35 LST, 16 LCI(L),19 LCT
5 submarine chasers: 2 PC, 3 SC

Close Support

10 LCS(L): Nos. 8, 27, 28, 29, 30, 41, 43, 44, 48, 50
8 LCI(R): Nos. 31, 34, 73, 226, 230, 331, 337, 338
6 LCI(G): Nos. 21, 22, 24, 61, 66, 67
3 LCI(M)

Screen

10 destroyers

4 Fletcher-class (5 × 5-in. main battery): Saufley, Waller, Philip, Robinson
4 Mahan-class (4 × 5-in. main battery): Drayton, Flusser, Conyngham, Smith
2 Benson-class (4 × 5-in. main battery): Bailey, Frazier

5 destroyer escorts

4 John C. Butler-class (2 × 5-in. main battery): Leland E. Thomas, Edwin A. Howard, Jesse Rutherford, Key
1 Rudderow-class (2 × 5-in. main battery): Chaffee

1 frigate: HMAS Gascoyne

Minesweeping Group

1 high-speed transport: Cofer
3 Admirable-class minesweepers: Sentry, Scout, Scuffle
39 YMS
1 LSM

Service, salvage and miscellaneous units

3 tugs: Cable, ATR-61, Pinto
4 oilers: Chepachet, Sakatonchee, Gualala, Banshee
1 cargo: Poinsett
1 repair ship: Creon

Covering Force (Task Force 74)

Covering Group 74.1

1 heavy cruiser: HMAS Shropshire (from 27 June)
1 light cruiser: HMAS Hobart (from 27 June)
2 Fletcher-class destroyers (5 × 5-in. main battery): Hart, Metcalf

Covering Group 74.2

5 light cruisers

4 Cleveland-class (12 × 6-in. main battery): Montpelier (from 15 June), Denver (from 15 June), Columbia (from 23 June), Cleveland (30 June – 1? July)
1 Tromp-class (6 × 5.9-in. main battery): HNLMS Tromp (from 19 June)

7 destroyers

6 Fletcher-class (5 × 5-in. main battery): Stevens, Conway, Cony, Eaton, Killen, Albert W. Grant
1 Tribal-class (3 × 4.7-in. main battery): HMAS Arunta

Covering Group 74.3

2 Brooklyn-class light cruisers (15 × 6-in. main battery): Phoenix (4–6 July), Nashville (4–6 July)
4 Fletcher-class destroyers (5 × 5-in. main battery): Charrette, Conner, Bell, Burns

Destroyers: 4 from 15 June, 7 from 27 June.
2 high speed transports: Schmitt, Kline (from 23 June)

Escort Carrier Group (Task Group 78.4): (from 1 to 3 July)

3 escort carriers

1 Sangamon-class (25-32 aircraft): Suwannee
2 Commencement Bay-class (34 aircraft): Block Island, Gilbert Islands

1 Bagley-class destroyer (4 × 5-in. main battery): Helm
5 destroyer escorts

3 Evarts-class (3 × 3-in. main battery): Mitchell, Donaldson, Cloues
2 Cannon-class (3 × 3-in. main battery): Lamons, Kyne

8 USN PT boats arrived with the tender Mobjack on 27 June, and this force was expanded to two PT boat squadrons (10 and 27) on 6 July.

=== Japanese units ===
IJA Thirty-Seventh Army (Note: A Japanese army was equivalent to a Euro-American corps.)

432nd, 454th, 455th, 553rd, 554th, 774th Independent Infantry Battalions
20th, 22nd Independent Machine Gun Battalions
64th Independent AA Gun Company
307th, 332nd Independent Motorcar Company
103rd Field Road Unit
75th Construction Duty Unit
147th Line-of-Communication Hospital
37th Army MP
4th Signal Unit

IJN 22nd Special Base Force

2nd Guard Unit
995th Air Unit
103rd Air Unit
6th Shinyo Unit
2nd Harbor Duty Unit

== Bibliography ==
=== Print ===
- ‘Japanese Monograph Number 26: Borneo Operations. 1941–1945’ in War in Asia and the Pacific. Volume 6. The Southern Area (Part I).
- Barbey, Daniel E. (Vice Adm., USN, ret.) (1969). MacArthur's Amphibious Navy: Seventh Fleet Amphibious Force Operations 1943-1945. Annapolis: Naval Institute Press. LCCN 69-15944.
- Craven, Wesley; Cate, James (1953). The Army Air Forces in World War Two. Volume V: Matterhorn to Nagasaki. Washington, D.C.: Government Printing Office.
- Morison, Samuel Eliot (1959). The Liberation of the Philippines: Luzon, Mindanao, the Visayas 1944–1945. History of U.S. Naval Operations in World War II. Vol. XIII. Boston: Little, Brown and Company. LCCN 47001571.
- Royal Navy (1959). Naval Staff History Second World War: War with Japan, Volume VI; The Advance to Japan. London: British Admiralty.
- Stanley, Peter (1997). Tarakan: An Australian Tragedy. Sydney: Allen & Unwin. ISBN 1-86448-278-8.

=== Web ===
- Australian Official Histories of World War II
  - Gavin Long (1963), The Final Campaigns. Australian War Memorial, Canberra.
  - G. Hermon Gill (1968), Royal Australian Navy 1942–45. Australian War Memorial, Canberra.
  - George Odgers (1968), Air War Against Japan, 1943–45. Australian War Memorial, Canberra.
