= 25th Independent Mixed Regiment =

- Active: 1944–45
- Country: Japan
- Branch: Imperial Japanese Army
- Size: Three infantry battalions with supporting units
- Part of: Thirty-Seventh Army
- Engagements: World War II: Battle of the Visayas; Borneo Campaign

The 25th Independent Mixed Regiment was a regiment of the Imperial Japanese Army (IJA) active during World War II. It was raised in July 1944, and deployed to Borneo in September that year. Elements of the regiment briefly saw combat against the United States Army on islands near Tawi-Tawi Island and against Australian forces during the Battle of North Borneo.

== History ==
The 25th Independent Mixed Regiment (25th IMR) was one of a group of ten such units raised in Japan during June and July 1944. These units had an authorised strength of 83 officers, 15 warrant officers and 2,132 enlisted soldiers. They comprised:

- Regimental headquarters
- Three infantry battalions (each with 590 men, and organised into three rifle companies, a machine gun company and a 70mm howitzer platoon)
- Infantry gun company (equipped with four 75mm regimental guns)
- Anti-tank company (equipped with four 37mm guns)
- Engineer company.

The regiment was established in July 1944 to bolster the Borneo Defence Army (which was later renamed the Thirty-Seventh Army). All of the regiment other than its 2nd Battalion was transported from Japan to Labuan off Borneo during September on board the battleships Fusō and Yamashiro. The regimental headquarters, 1st and 3rd Battalions were then transferred to Tawi-Tawi Island where an Allied landing was expected. The 2nd Battalion subsequently arrived at Labuan, and was ordered to march across the interior of Borneo rejoin the rest of the regiment due to a shortage of shipping; it eventually reached Sandakan. In February 1945 all elements of the 25th IMR on Tawi-Tawi Island other than the 9th Company of the 3rd Battalion were withdrawn to Tawao on the mainland of Borneo due to the difficulty of supplying the island.

Soon after arriving on the mainland, the 25th IMR was ordered to march across Borneo to the Brunei Bay area with the 56th Independent Mixed Brigade. This required the soldiers to march on tracks for hundreds of kilometres through mountainous jungle with inadequate food supplies. The 2nd Battalion arrived at Jesselton in February, and all other elements of the regiment arrived there in May. The 25th IMR was assigned responsibility for defending the coastal area between Beaufort and Tuaran.

Elements of the 25th IMR saw combat during the Battle of the Visayas and Battle of North Borneo in April and July 1945 respectively. At this time the regiment was one of the main elements of the Thirty-Seventh Army, along with the 56th and 71st Independent Mixed Brigades. The 9th Company resisted the 2nd Battalion of the US Army 163rd Infantry Regiment's landings on small islands off Tawi-Tawi between 2 and 6 April before withdrawing in small boats to the mainland of Borneo. Around 30 Japanese were killed in this fighting, and two Americans were killed and four wounded. After reaching Sandakan, the company began an overland march to re-join the remainder of the regiment, and was at Ranau at the end of the war. The only part of the main body of the 25th IMR's sector to be attacked was Papar. The regiment did not resist the Australian 2/32nd Battalion's occupation of Papar on 12 July, with Australian official historian Gavin Long writing that its only defenders were "two Japanese with a machine-gun who made off as the Australians approached". At the end of the war the 25th IMR had a strength of over 900 personnel.
