= USS Metcalf =

Fletcher-class destroyer

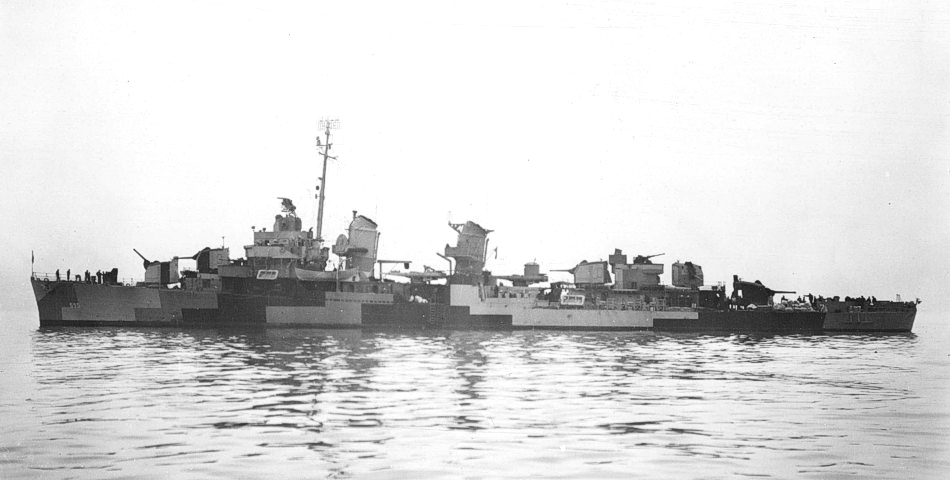
- USS Metcalf (DD-595) at Puget Sound, 1944

History

United States
- Name: Metcalf
- Namesake: James Metcalf
- Builder: Puget Sound Naval Shipyard
- Laid down: 10 August 1943
- Launched: 25 September 1944
- Commissioned: 18 November 1944
- Decommissioned: March 1946
- Stricken: 2 January 1971
- Fate: Sold for scrap, 6 June 1972

General characteristics
- Class & type: Fletcher-class destroyer
- Displacement: 2,050 tons
- Length: 376 ft 6 in (114.76 m)
- Beam: 39 ft 8 in (12.09 m)
- Draft: 17 ft 9 in (5.41 m)
- Propulsion: 60,000 shp (45,000 kW); 2 propellers
- Speed: 35 knots (65 km/h; 40 mph)
- Range: 6,500 nmi (12,000 km; 7,500 mi) at 15 knots (28 km/h; 17 mph)
- Complement: 329
- Armament: 5 × 5 in (127 mm) guns; 4 × 40 mm AA guns; 4 × 20 mm AA guns; 10 × 21 in (533 mm) torpedo tubes, 6 × depth charge projectors; 2 × depth charge tracks

USS Metcalf (DD-595), was a Fletcher-class destroyer of the United States Navy named for James Metcalf, who served on the schooner USS Enterprise during the First Barbary War.

== Namesake ==
James Metcalf, also spelled Medcalf in records, boarded schooner USS Enterprise as a seaman at Malta on 16 May 1803. On 19 September 1804 he was promoted to boatswain's mate and transferred the next day to the brig USS Syren. He also served on the frigates USS Essex and USS Constitution. On 16 February 1804 Metcalf was one of 84 handpicked volunteers from Enterprise to join Lieutenant Stephen Decatur's expedition into Tripoli Harbor on 16 February 1804 to destroy USS Philadelphia, a United States frigate captured by Tripolitan pirates in the First Barbary War.

== Construction and commissioning ==
Metcalf was laid down by Puget Sound Navy Yard, Bremerton, Washington, 10 August 1943; launched 25 September 1944; sponsored by Mrs. Harold C. Pound; and commissioned 18 November 1944.

== History ==
Following shakedown off San Diego, California, Metcalf was assigned to the Pacific Fleet for duty. The destroyer departed Bremerton, Wash., 19 February 1945 for the Carolines via Pearl Harbor, Territory of Hawaii, arriving at Ulithi on 16 March.

Just in time to join the armada of warships staging there for the Okinawa campaign, Metcalf operated with escort carrier Group 3. From 27 March her group furnished close air support for the landings at Kerama Retto (26 March) and Okinawa (1 April), and made raids on the neighboring Japanese-held islands until 20 April. During this period the ship rescued half a dozen pilots and crewmembers of downed carrier planes. She also performed radar picket and screen operations.

Metcalf departed on the 20th for the Philippines via Guam, reporting to commander, 7th Fleet, at Leyte 30 April. The destroyer spent May and June convoying the fast cruisers and transports being assembled for the Borneo invasion.

On 9 June Metcalf arrived off Brunei Bay, Borneo, for 2 days patrol of the South China Sea before beginning shore bombardment in support of the Australian landing at Brunei Bay the 10th. After action off Miri-Lutong, south of Brunei Bay, from 19 to 21 June, she reached Balikpapan on the 27th for operations with Task Force 74 (TF 74) prior to the main landing by Australian troops 1 July.

Metcalf reported to commander, Philippine sea frontier, 4 August for duty escorting convoys between the Philippines and Okinawa. She was one day out of Okinawa in antisubmarine formation for Convoy 10K-204 when the Japanese capitulated.

Assigned to the newly formed North China Force, the destroyer departed Okinawa 4 September to participate in the landing of Army occupation forces at Korea. Metcalf joined Shields, Hart, and Conner in leading Task Unit 78.1.15 (TU 78.1.15) into Jinsen 8 September through the mine-infested Yellow Sea. She stood ready to provide fire support for the landing troops the next day if needed.

On 12 September Metcalf got underway through the Yellow Sea for operations supporting the occupation of China. Her ports of call included Dairen, Qinhuangdao, Taku, Yantai, Shanghai, and Hong Kong.

In early 1946 Metcalf steamed for the west coast, via Pearl Harbor, arriving San Diego to report in March to the 16th (Inactive Reserve) Fleet. She decommissioned March 1946, and entered the Pacific Reserve Fleet there. After berthing at Long Beach, California, from 1 July 1951 into 1960, Metcalf moved to Stockton, California.

Metcalf was stricken 2 January 1971; she was sold 6 June 1972 and broken up for scrap.

Metcalf received three battle stars for World War II service.
