= Enyu =

Enyu (Bulgarian: Еню) is a masculine given name that may refer to

- Emperor En'yū (959–991), Emperor of Japan
- Enyu Todorov (1943–2022), Bulgarian wrestler
- Enyu Valchev (1936–2014), Bulgarian wrestler
- Wu Enyu (1909–1979), Chinese philosopher, political scientist and literary critic
