= USS Cloues =

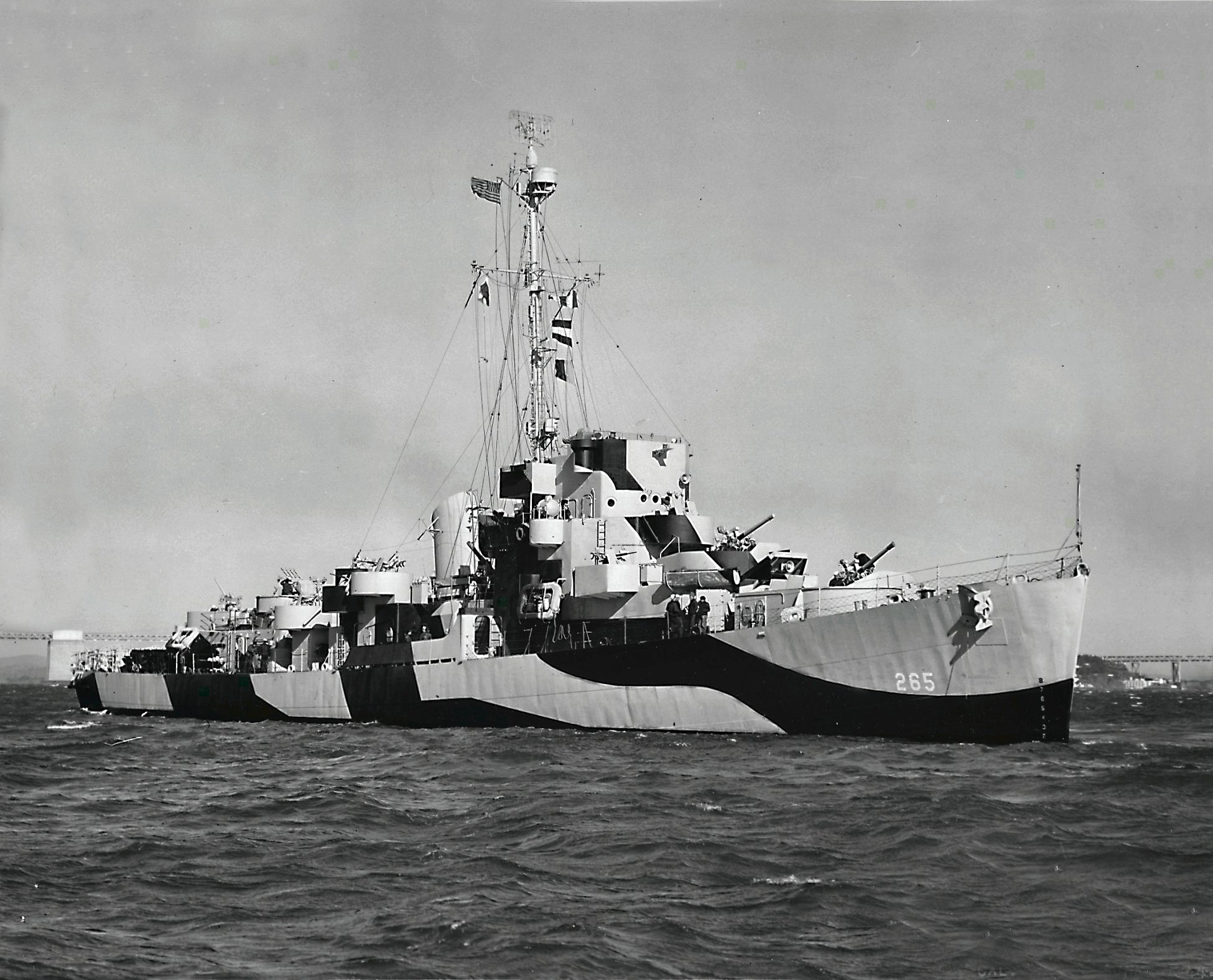
- Cloues underway on 2 February 1944

History

United States
- Name: USS Cloues
- Builder: Boston Navy Yard
- Laid down: 23 February 1943
- Launched: 6 April 1943
- Commissioned: 10 August 1943
- Decommissioned: 26 November 1945
- Stricken: 5 December 1945
- Honors and awards: 3 battle stars (World War II)
- Fate: Sold for scrapping, 22 May 1947

General characteristics
- Type: Evarts-class destroyer escort
- Displacement: 1,140 long tons (1,158 t) standard; 1,430 long tons (1,453 t) full
- Length: 289 ft 5 in (88.21 m) o/a; 283 ft 6 in (86.41 m) w/l
- Beam: 35 ft 2 in (10.72 m)
- Draft: 11 ft (3.4 m) (max)
- Propulsion: 4 × General Motors Model 16-278A diesel engines with electric drive, 6,000 shp (4,474 kW); 2 screws
- Speed: 19 knots (35 km/h; 22 mph)
- Range: 4,150 nmi (7,690 km)
- Complement: 15 officers and 183 enlisted
- Armament: 3 × single 3"/50 Mk.22 dual purpose guns; 1 × quad 1.1"/75 Mk.2 AA gun; 9 × 20 mm Mk.4 AA guns; 1 × Hedgehog Projector Mk.10 (144 rounds); 8 × Mk.6 depth charge projectors; 2 × Mk.9 depth charge tracks

USS Cloues (DE-265) was an Evarts-class destroyer escort of the United States Navy during World War II. She served in the Pacific Theater, escorting convoys and other ships against Japanese submarines and aircraft. Cloues conducted extensive escort and antisubmarine operations and received three battle stars for her World War II service.

== Design ==
The Evarts-class destroyer escorts were 289 ft 5 in (88.21 m) long overall, and they had a beam of 35 ft 2 in (10.72 m). They had an average draft of 10 ft 1 in (3.07 m) at their full load displacement of 1,416 long tons (1,439 t). Each ship had a normal crew numbered 156 officers and sailors.

Cloues was propelled by a pair of diesel motors manufactured by General Motors, which drove a pair of screw propellers. Her propulsion system was rated to produce 6,000 brake horsepower (4,500 kW) for a top speed of 19.5 knots (36.1 km/h; 22.4 mph). Oil storage amounted to between 131 and 197 long tons (133 and 200 t), which allowed a cruising radius of up to 6,000 nautical miles (11,000 km; 6,900 mi) at an economical pace of 10 knots (19 km/h; 12 mph).

The ship's armament consisted of a main battery of three 3-inch (76 mm) /50-caliber guns in individual pivot mounts, which could be used against air or surface targets. These were supported by a light anti-aircraft battery that initially consisted of four 1.1 in (28 mm) /75-caliber guns in a quadruple mount and nine 20 mm (0.79 in) Oerlikon guns. For attacks against submarines, the ship was equipped with a Hedgehog mortar, eight depth charge throwers, and two depth charge racks.

== Service history ==
Named for Edward Cloues, an officer killed aboard USS Arizona during the attack on Pearl Harbor, Cloues was built at the Boston Navy Yard. The ship was launched on 6 April 1943 and sponsored on her commissioning day by Mrs. H. B. Cloues, mother of the ship's namesake. Cloues was commissioned on 10 August 1943.

Cloues stood out of Boston, Massachusetts, on 4 October 1943 for New York, the Panama Canal, San Francisco, California, and Pearl Harbor, arriving on 17 November. She conducted gunnery exercises, battle practice, and landing operations off Oahu until 30 November, when she sailed in convoy to San Francisco. For the next months she had escort duty in the Hawaiian Islands and to San Francisco. On 29 February, she sailed from Pearl Harbor for Johnston Island and the Gilberts, arriving on 11 March for escort duty and to cover the landings at Bikini, Enyu, and Rongelap. From 22 March Cloues was based on Kwajalein for screening duty in the Marshalls.

Cloues was assigned to a special mission scouting the Japanese-held islands of Jaluit, Wotje, Mille, and Loj (Erikub Atoll) between 2 and 27 May 1944. She launched and recovered a reconnaissance party consisting of an officer, an interpreter, and three native scouts who operated with outriggers. This group was able to evaluate the results of bombings of these islands during the previous months. With her mission successfully completed, Cloues resumed escort duties from Eniwetok in support of the Guam operation.

Convoy escort duty between Eniwetok and Saipan occupied Cloues from 25 November until 23 December 1944, and from that time until 10 March 1945 she had escort duty from Eniwetok to Ulithi and Kossol Roads. On 22 March Cloues sailed in support of the Okinawa operation serving in anti-submarine and anti-aircraft screening, on plane guard duty, destroying mines, and transferring personnel, mail, and freight. Cloues returned to Ulithi on 28 April, and sailed on 4 May for San Pedro Bay, Philippine Islands, for screening duty until 27 May, when she returned to Ulithi. She sailed on 9 June for San Pedro Bay, where she made rendezvous for the amphibious landings at Balikpapan. She returned to San Pedro Bay on 8 July, and sailed for Eniwetok, Pearl Harbor, and San Francisco, arriving on 29 July. Cloues was decommissioned on 26 November 1945, and sold on 22 May 1947.

== Awards ==
Cloues received three battle stars for World War II service.
