= USS Cofer =

Buckley-class destroyer escort

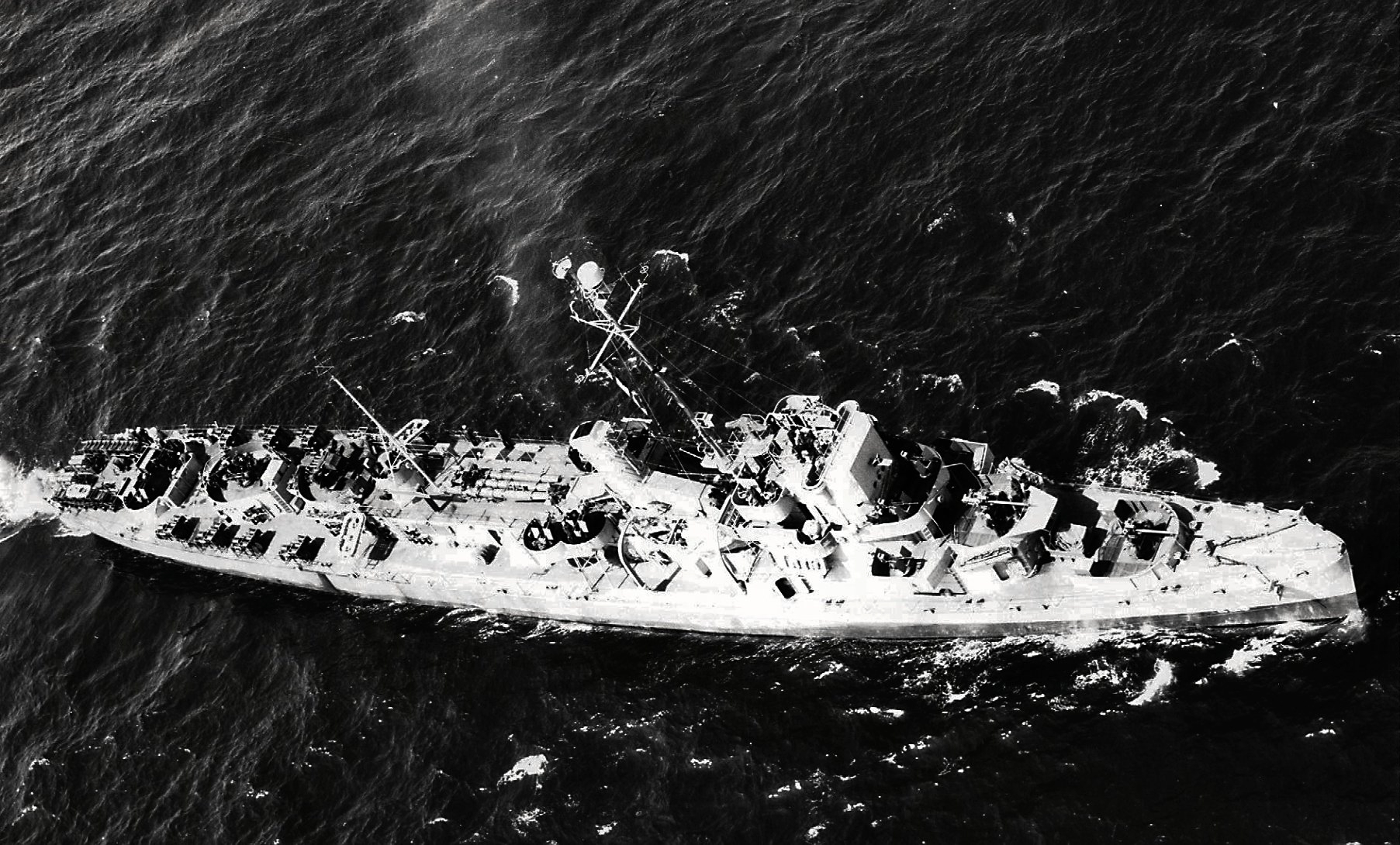

History

United States
- Name: USS Cofer
- Namesake: John Joseph Cofer
- Ordered: 1942
- Builder: Charleston Navy Yard
- Laid down: 12 May 1943
- Launched: 6 September 1943
- Commissioned: 19 January 1944
- Decommissioned: 28 June 1946
- Reclassified: APD-62, 5 July 1944
- Stricken: 1 April 1966
- Honors and awards: 8 battle stars (World War II)
- Fate: Sold for scrap, 5 March 1968

General characteristics
- Class & type: Buckley-class destroyer escort
- Displacement: 1,400 long tons (1,422 t) light; 1,740 long tons (1,768 t) standard
- Length: 306 ft (93 m)
- Beam: 37 ft (11 m)
- Draft: 9 ft 6 in (2.90 m) standard; 11 ft 3 in (3.43 m) full load
- Propulsion: 2 × boilers; General Electric turbo-electric drive; 12,000 shp (8.9 MW); 2 × solid manganese-bronze 3,600 lb (1,600 kg) 3-bladed propellers, 8 ft 6 in (2.59 m) diameter, 7 ft 7 in (2.31 m) pitch; 2 × rudders; 359 tons fuel oil
- Speed: 23 knots (43 km/h; 26 mph)
- Range: 3,700 nmi (6,900 km) at 15 kn (28 km/h; 17 mph); 6,000 nmi (11,000 km) at 12 kn (22 km/h; 14 mph)
- Complement: 15 officers, 198 men
- Armament: 3 × 3"/50 caliber guns; 1 × quad 1.1"/75 caliber gun; 8 × single 20 mm guns; 1 × triple 21-inch (533 mm) torpedo tubes; 1 × Hedgehog anti-submarine mortar; 8 × K-gun depth charge projectors; 2 × depth charge tracks

USS Cofer (DE-208/APD-62) was a Buckley-class destroyer escort in service with the United States Navy from 1944 to 1946. She was scrapped in 1968.

== History ==
USS Cofer was named in honor of John Joseph Cofer (1919–1942), who was killed in action on 13 November 1942 during the Naval Battle of Guadalcanal, while serving aboard the destroyer USS Aaron Ward. The ship was launched on 6 September 1943 by Charleston Navy Yard, sponsored by Mrs. M. J. Cofer, mother of Seaman First Class Cofer; and commissioned on 19 January 1944.

=== Battle of the Atlantic ===
Cofer escorted convoys on two transatlantic crossings, between New York and Gibraltar and Norfolk, Virginia and Bizerte, Tunisia, from 23 March to 30 June 1944.

=== Pacific War ===
Cofer returned to New York for conversion to a Charles Lawrence-class high speed transport. She was reclassified APD-62 on 5 July 1944. She sailed from New York on 26 September 1944, and arrived at Hollandia, New Guinea, 4 November for duty with the 7th Fleet. She carried troops in one of the first resupply convoys for landings on Leyte, sailing with a group which fought its way through Japanese air attacks to arrive off the beaches on 24 November. Unloading at furious pace, Cofer was cleared the same day for Palau, where she embarked additional troops for the landings at Ormoc Bay on 7 and 8 December. On the first day, as suicide planes attacked in great number, Cofer joined in general firing, and went to the aid of sister ship Liddle (APD-60), when she was damaged by a kamikaze. Cofer next came under enemy air attack on 15 December, as she landed assault troops on Mindoro.

Continuing in her role in the return to the Philippines, Cofer landed reinforcements at Lingayen Gulf on 11 and 12 January 1945, and then in a series of unopposed landings on Luzon, and in assaults on Palawan on 28 February, Zamboanga on 10 March, and Cebu on 26 March, the last under heavy mortar fire from the beach. Between 27 April and 8 May 1945, Cofer operated as flagship and covering vessel for minesweepers clearing the waters off Tarakan, Borneo, in support of the invasion on 1 May. On 2 May, as the group swept the straits to prepare for motor torpedo boat operations off Cape Djoeata, concealed shore batteries sank YMS-481. According to the Final Muster Roll from the YMS-481, Cofer destroyed the batteries and rescued 18 survivors of YMS-481. She continued to participate in minesweeping preceding the invasion of Brunei Bay from 7 to 11 June and Balikpapan from 15 June to 10 July. On 8 June, she assisted minesweeper Salute (AM-294) who had struck a mine, and rescued 59 survivors, 42 of whom were injured. On 18 June, she rescued 23 survivors of YMS-50.

Cofer departed San Pedro Bay, Leyte, on 29 August and arrived at Buckner Bay, Okinawa, on 1 September. She voyaged to Nagasaki in September to evacuate former prisoners of war, then returned to Sasebo, on 28 September, to operate with the 7th Fleet on various duties in support of the occupation at Okinawa and Fusan, Korea. She embarked passengers at Okinawa and departed on 26 November for San Diego, arriving on 16 December. Unloading her passengers, she sailed on 26 December for the east coast, arriving at Brooklyn on 9 January 1946.

=== Decommissioning and fate ===
Cofer was placed out of commission, in reserve, on 28 June 1946, berthed at Green Cove Springs, Florida. She was struck from the Navy List on 1 April 1966 and sold for scrap on 5 March 1968.

== Awards ==
Cofer received eight battle stars for World War II service.
