= 71st Independent Mixed Brigade =

- Active: 1944–45
- Country: Japan
- Branch: Imperial Japanese Army
- Part of: Thirty-Seventh Army
- Engagements: World War II

The 71st Independent Mixed Brigade was an Imperial Japanese Army unit of World War II. It was formed in September 1944 to be used to reinforce Japanese forces in Borneo. Two of its four intended infantry battalions were never established.

== History ==
The 71st Independent Mixed Brigade (IMB) was established in September 1944 by the Southern Expeditionary Army Group as one of three such units formed that month to reinforce Japanese-held positions in French Indochina, Borneo and Burma. The 71st IMB was intended for service in Borneo, and was to be manned by personnel sent from Japan.

The main elements of the 71st IMB were to be the 538th, 539th, 540th and 541st Independent Infantry Battalions. The formation was to also comprise a brigade headquarters, signal unit, artillery unit and an engineer unit. This structure was the same as that used for most IMBs which came under the command of the Southern Expeditionary Army Group.

The 71st IMB was assigned to defend southern Borneo, as an element of the Thirty-Seventh Army. The disruption caused by the Philippines campaign affected the process of establishing the brigade there, and two of its infantry battalions and the brigade engineer unit were never formed.

== See also ==
- Borneo campaign (1945) order of battle
- Independent Mixed Brigades (Imperial Japanese Army)
