= Wu Enyu =

Manchu-Chinese philosopher and political scientist

Wu Enyu (Chinese: 吳恩裕; pinyin: Wú Ēnyù, *1909 †1979) was a Manchu-Chinese philosopher, political scientist and literary critic. For the literacy part he was especially known for his criticism of The Dream of the Red Chamber.

Wu graduated from the Department of Philosophy of Tsinghua University in 1933, and served as an editor of the philosophical and literary monthly periodical Wenzhe yuekan (Chinese: 文哲月刊; pinyin: Wénzhé yuèkān) and the Sibian (Chinese: 思辯; pinyin: Sībiàn), a literary and philosophical supplement of Chenbao magazine (Chinese: 晨報; pinyin: Chénbào). He was a student of professor Zhang Dongsun at Tsinghua. Wu then went for a short-term further study to London in 1936.

From 1939 to 1946 after his study, Wu held the position of professor of political sciences at the National Central University in Chongqing, whose successor is now known as Nanjing University. He was a professor at Peking University from 1946 to 1951.

From 1978 until his death a year later, he was named research fellow at the Chinese Academy of Social Sciences.
