= USS Newman =

Buckley-class destroyer escort

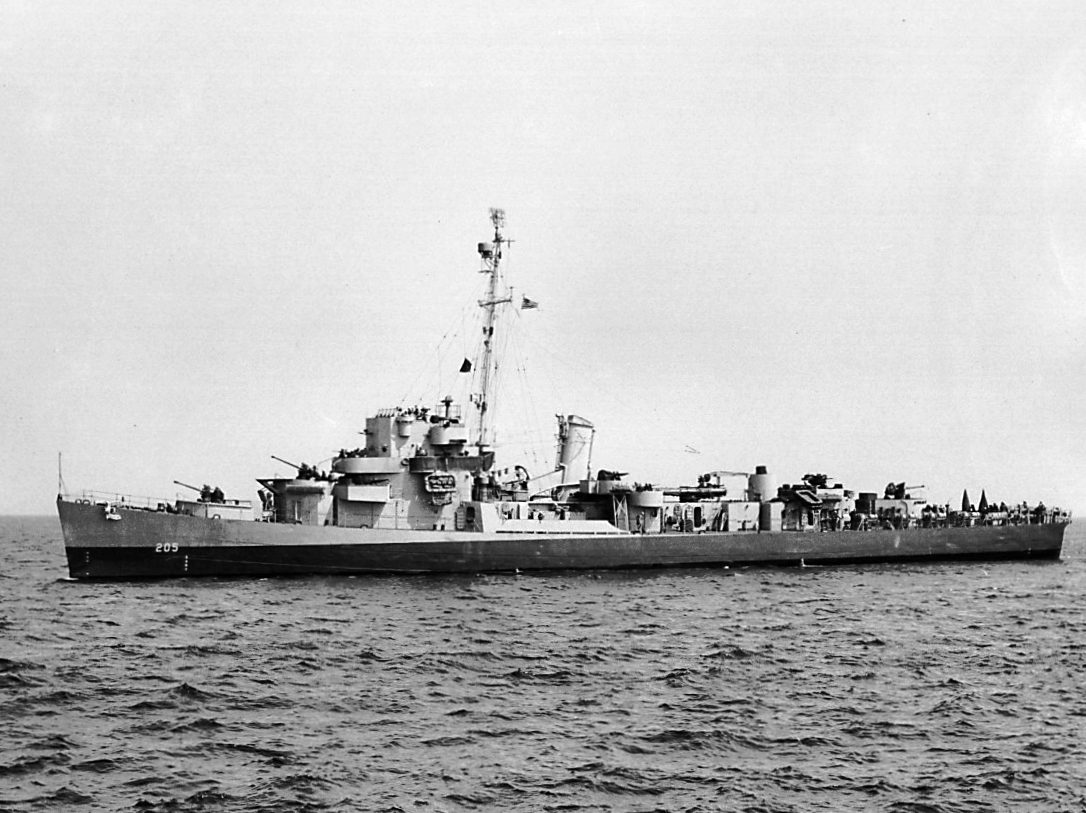

History

United States
- Name: USS Newman
- Namesake: Laxton Gail Newman
- Ordered: 1942
- Builder: Charleston Navy Yard
- Laid down: 8 June 1943
- Launched: 9 August 1943
- Commissioned: 26 November 1943
- Decommissioned: 18 February 1946
- Reclassified: APD-59, 5 July 1944
- Stricken: 1 September 1964
- Honors and awards: 5 battle stars (World War II)
- Fate: Sold for scrap, 15 August 1966

General characteristics
- Class & type: Buckley-class destroyer escort
- Displacement: 1,400 long tons (1,422 t) light; 1,740 long tons (1,768 t) standard
- Length: 306 ft (93 m)
- Beam: 37 ft (11 m)
- Draft: 9 ft 6 in (2.90 m) standard; 11 ft 3 in (3.43 m) full load
- Propulsion: 2 × boilers; General Electric turbo-electric drive; 12,000 shp (8.9 MW); 2 × solid manganese-bronze 3,600 lb (1,600 kg) 3-bladed propellers, 8 ft 6 in (2.59 m) diameter, 7 ft 7 in (2.31 m) pitch; 2 × rudders; 359 tons fuel oil
- Speed: 23 knots (43 km/h; 26 mph)
- Range: 3,700 nmi (6,900 km) at 15 kn (28 km/h; 17 mph); 6,000 nmi (11,000 km) at 12 kn (22 km/h; 14 mph)
- Complement: 15 officers, 198 men
- Armament: 3 × 3"/50 caliber guns; 1 × quad 1.1"/75 caliber gun; 8 × single 20 mm guns; 1 × triple 21-inch (533 mm) torpedo tubes; 1 × Hedgehog anti-submarine mortar; 8 × K-gun depth charge projectors; 2 × depth charge tracks

USS Newman (DE-205/APD-59) was a Buckley-class destroyer escort in service with the United States Navy from 1943 to 1946. She was scrapped in 1966.

== History ==
Newman was named in honor of Laxton Gail Newman (1916–1941), who was killed in action during the Japanese attack on Pearl Harbor on 7 December 1941. He was posthumously awarded the Purple Heart for his actions. The ship was laid down by the Charleston Navy Yard on 8 June 1943; launched on 9 August 1943; sponsored by Mrs. J. B. Newman, mother of L. G. Newman AD3; and commissioned on 26 November 1943.

Following shakedown off Bermuda, Newman was assigned transatlantic escort duty. Between 11 February and 29 June 1944, she crossed the ocean six times. On 30 June, at Tompkinsville, Staten Island Naval Base, she commenced conversion to a Charles Lawrence-class high speed transport, reporting for shakedown in Chesapeake Bay as APD-59 on 19 September.

At the end of the month she departed Norfolk, Virginia, as flagship of TransDiv 103, and headed for the Pacific. Arriving at Hollandia on 4 November, she escorted supply convoys between that port and Leyte Gulf until 12 December. Then, at Leyte, she embarked troops of the 24th Division and got underway for her first amphibious operation, the 15 December invasion of Mindoro. Landing her troops with the first waves, she turned back to Leyte, then proceeded to New Guinea to prepare for the initial operations of 1945.

At Noemfoor, she took on troops of the 158th Regimental Combat Team and proceeded back to the Philippines. On the 11th, two days after the initial invasion of Luzon, she landed her troops on the Lingayen beaches under the cover of naval shore bombardment, then provided gunfire support until retiring to escort a convoy back to Leyte, arriving on 15 January. Assignments to amphibious landings, and their support, now increased as the momentum of the war in the Philippines picked up. On 29 January, she participated in landings at San Felipe, Luzon; on the 30th, on Grande Island in Subic Bay; on 28 February at Puerto Princesa, Palawan; on 10 March at Zamboanga, Mindanao; on 26 March at Talisay, Cebu; and on 17 April at Parang, Mindanao. In May, she shifted to Morotai and in June and July participated in landings in Borneo at Brunei Bay on 10 June, and Balikpapan on 1 July.

On 16 July, she departed the East Indies to return to the Philippines, arriving Leyte the 18th and to Legaspi, Luzon, on the 27th, where she conducted training exercises for combat teams until the end of the war. On 29 August, she steamed to Okinawa, embarked units of the 24th Corps, Army Service Command for transportation to Jinsen, Korea. On 8 September, she landed the occupation forces at Jinsen and then commenced escort duty between Jinsen, Taku and the Philippines. On 26 November, she departed the Far East en route to New York.

Arriving there on 9 January 1946, she steamed south to Green Cove Springs, Florida, joining the 16th (Inactive) Fleet on 18 February. Later berthed at Orange, Texas, Newman remained a unit of the Atlantic Reserve Fleet until struck from the Navy List in 1964. On 15 August 1966 her hulk was sold for scrapping to the Boston Metals Company, Baltimore, Maryland.

== Awards ==
Newman earned five battle stars during World War II.
