= USS Key =

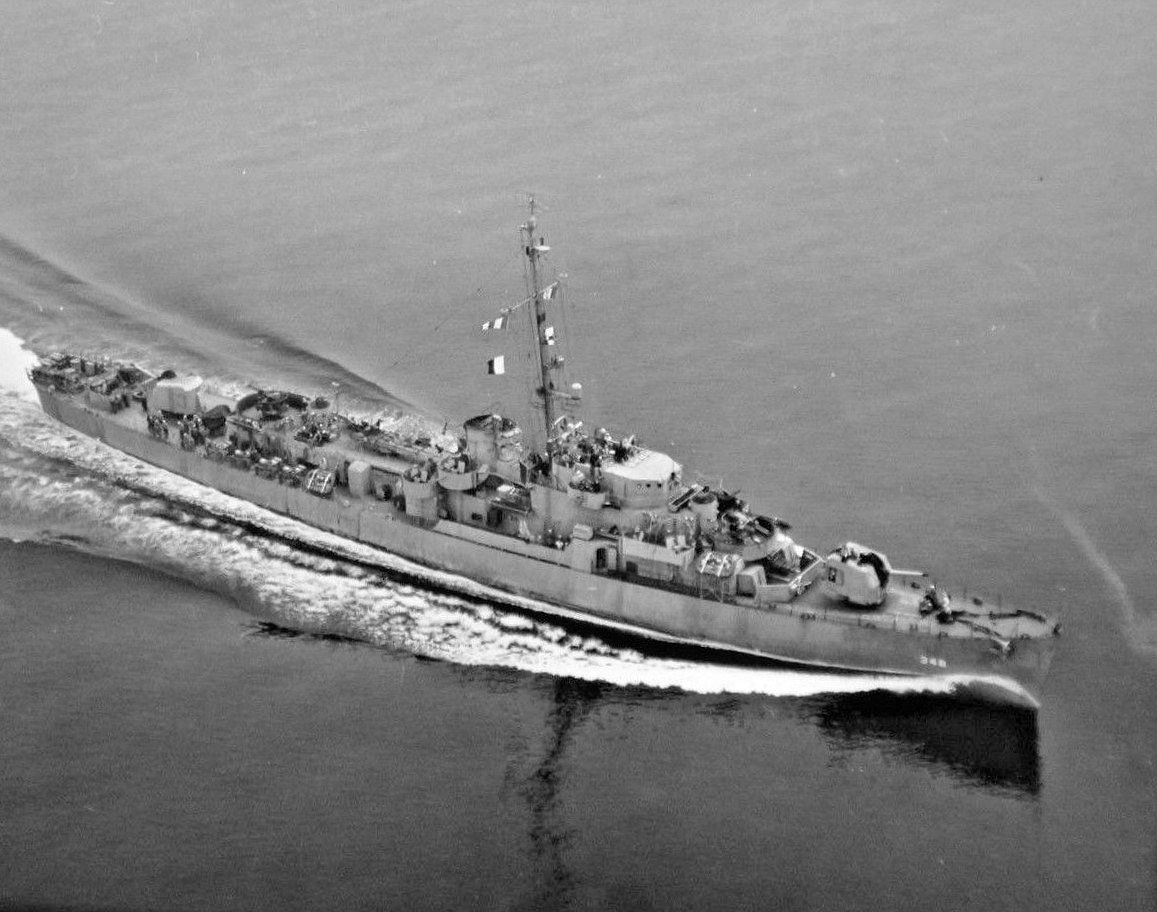
- USS Key (DE-348) underway c. 1944

History

United States
- Name: Key
- Namesake: Eugene Morland Key
- Builder: Consolidated Steel Corporation, Orange, Texas
- Laid down: 14 December 1943
- Launched: 12 February 1944
- Commissioned: 5 June 1944
- Decommissioned: 9 July 1946
- Stricken: 1 March 1972
- Honours and awards: 1 battle star for World War II
- Fate: Sold for scrapping 19 December 1972

General characteristics
- Class & type: John C. Butler-class destroyer escort
- Displacement: 1,350 long tons (1,372 t)
- Length: 306 ft (93 m)
- Beam: 36 ft 8 in (11.18 m)
- Draft: 9 ft 5 in (2.87 m)
- Propulsion: 2 boilers, 2 geared turbine engines, 12,000 shp (8,900 kW); 2 propellers
- Speed: 24 knots (44 km/h; 28 mph)
- Range: 6,000 nautical miles (11,000 km; 6,900 mi) at 12 kn (22 km/h; 14 mph)
- Complement: 14 officers, 201 enlisted
- Armament: 2 × single 5 in (127 mm) guns; 2 × twin 40 mm (1.6 in) AA guns; 10 × single 20 mm (0.79 in) AA guns; 1 × triple 21 in (533 mm) torpedo tubes; 8 × depth charge throwers; 1 × Hedgehog ASW mortar; 2 × depth charge racks

USS Key (DE-348) was a John C. Butler-class destroyer escort in service with the United States Navy from 1944 to 1946. She was scrapped in 1972.

== Namesake ==
Eugene Morland Key was born at Conroe, Texas on 5 October 1916. He enlisted as a Private in the U.S. Marine Corps Reserves on 17 January 1941. He was commissioned Second Lieutenant on 29 May, he served at San Diego, California and Washington, D.C., before joining the 1st Marine Raider Battalion on 19 March 1942. Promoted to First Lieutenant on 4 June.

He participated in the Battle of Tulagi, Solomons on 7 August 1942. While leading the assault against a heavily defended, enemy position, Key was hit by hostile sniper fire. Although mortally wounded, he struggled forward and threw hand grenades into the Japanese position, thus destroying the enemy resistance and allowing his platoon to advance without further loss. For his actions he was posthumously awarded the Navy Cross.

== History ==
Key was launched on 12 February 1944 by Consolidated Steel Corp., Orange, Texas, sponsored by Mrs. Ira F. Key, mother of Lt. Key; and commissioned on 5 June 1944.

=== North Atlantic operations ===
Following shakedown off Bermuda, Key operated out of Norfolk, Virginia, training crews for destroyer escorts and patrolling the North Atlantic in quest of submarines. Clearing Hampton Roads 20 September, she escorted a convoy to Naples, Italy, then returned to New York 24 October. As a unit of CortDiv 76, she sailed from New York 10 November for duty with the U.S. 7th Fleet in the Southwest Pacific.

=== Transfer to the Pacific Fleet ===
Key arrived Hollandia, New Guinea, 27 December, and between 1 January 1945 and 6 February she made five escort runs from Hollandia to Leyte Gulf. On 9 February she began antisubmarine patrols east of Leyte Gulf; then she steamed to Mangarin Bay, Mindoro, 19 February for similar duty in the South China Sea. Returning to Leyte 14 March, the versatile destroyer escort operated out of Leyte Gulf and Polloc, Mindanao, screening ships en route to Lingayen Gulf, Luzon; Zamboanga, Mindanao; Jolo, Sulu Archipelago; and Legaspi and Manila, Luzon. After escorting a convoy of LSMs and LCIs to Davao Gulf 15 May, Key bombarded and destroyed an important Japanese patrol boat base at Piso Point before returning to Polloc on 17 May.

After additional escort runs to Davao Gulf, Leyte Gulf, and Legaspi, Luzon, Key departed Manila Bay 11 June for duty in the Dutch East Indies. Arriving Morotai Island on 14 June, she screened Tawitawi-bound LCIs from 23 to 26 June before escorting a convoy on 28 June to a rendezvous the following day with the amphibious force en route to the assault at Balikpapan, Borneo. While at Balikpapan on 7 July, Key rescued a survivor from an LCM sunk by a mine in the harbor. She patrolled for enemy submarines until 22 July when she sailed via Morotai for Leyte Gulf, arriving 4 August.

=== End-of-war operations ===
Operating out of Leyte after the end of hostilities, Key steamed on antisubmarine patrols east of Leyte from 22 to 31 August and escorted a convoy to Ulithi, Western Carolines before sailing to Manila on 8 September. Between 18 September and 23 November she made two escort runs from Manila Bay to Okinawa to support American occupation operations in Japan. Clearing Manila Bay on 25 November, she embarked homebound veterans on 27 November at Guiuan, Samar and departed the next day for the United States.

=== Post-war decommissioning ===
Arriving at San Pedro, Los Angeles on 17 December, Key decommissioned on 9 July 1946 at Terminal Island and entered the Pacific Reserve Fleet. She was struck from the Navy List on 1 March 1972 and sold for scrap on 19 December 1972.

== Awards ==
Key received one battle star for World War II service.
