= Masao Baba =

Japanese officer, war criminal (1892–1947)

- 馬場 正郎
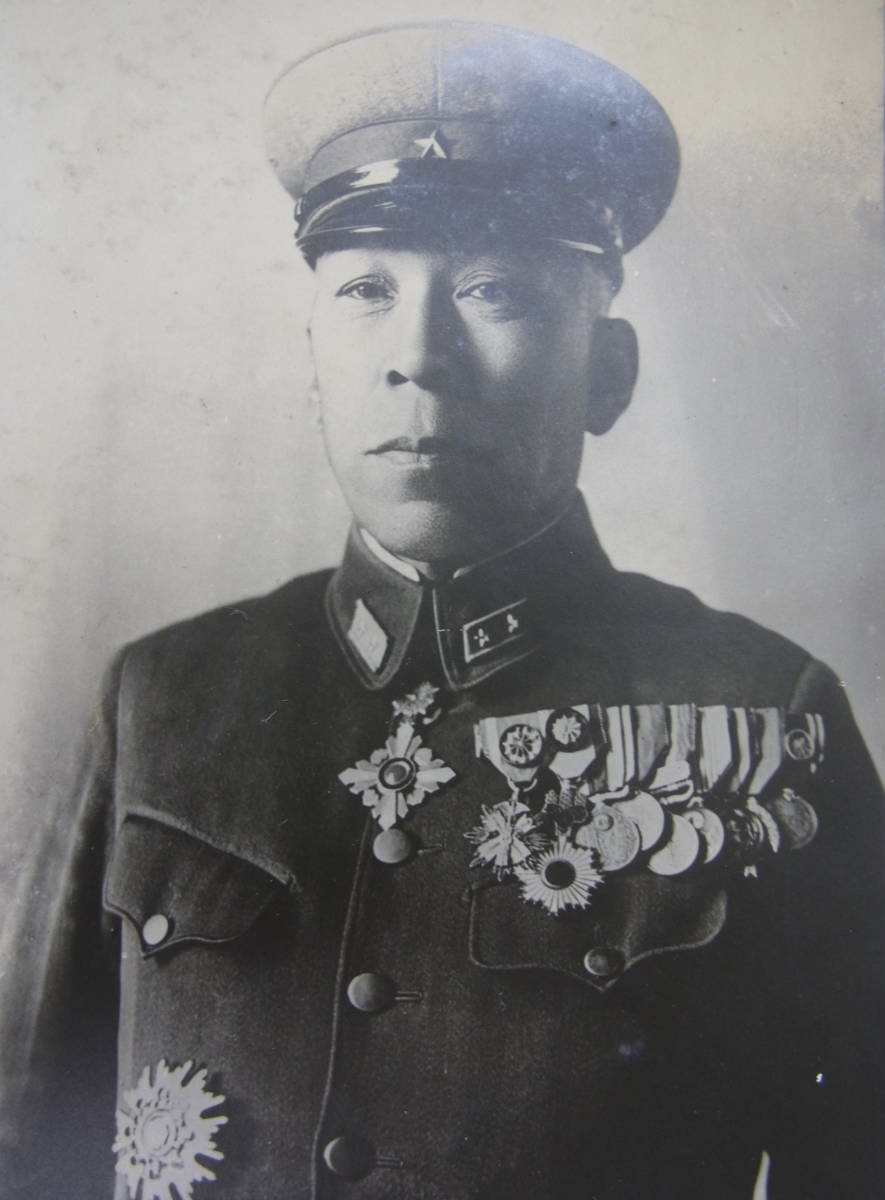
- Born: 7 January 1892; Kumamoto Prefecture, Japan
- Died: 7 August 1947 (aged 55); Rabaul, Territory of New Guinea
- Cause of death: Execution by hanging
- Military career
- Allegiance: Empire of Japan
- Branch: Imperial Japanese Army
- Service years: 1909–1945
- Rank: Lieutenant General
- Commands: IJA 37th Army
- Conflicts: Second Sino-Japanese War; World War II

Masao Baba (馬場 正郎, Baba Masao; 7 January 1892 – 7 August 1947) was a general in the Imperial Japanese Army, commanding the Japanese ground forces of the Borneo Campaign of 1945 in the closing months of the war.

== Biography ==
Baba was born in Kumamoto prefecture, as the son of Lieutenant Baba Masayuki, a career officer in the Imperial Japanese Army, and his wife. He attended military preparatory schools from childhood, starting with the Army Cadet School in Hiroshima, whose curriculum was based on Prussian models. He graduated from the 24th class of the Imperial Japanese Army Academy in December 1912, specializing in cavalry. As a second lieutenant, he was assigned to the IJA 5th Cavalry Regiment.

Baba studied as part of the 33rd class of the Army War College, graduating in November 1921. He remained in the cavalry throughout his career, and was attached to the Inspectorate of Cavalry from 1933 to 1935, where he served as an instructor at the cavalry school. In 1935, Baba was promoted to colonel and subsequently given command of the IJA 2nd Cavalry Regiment from 1935 to 1938.

In July 1938, Baba was promoted to major general, and served as commanding officer of the IJA 3rd Cavalry Brigade to 1939. From 1939 to 1940, he served as a staff officer with the Inspectorate of Cavalry. He became the commander-in-chief of all cavalry operations from 2 December 1940 to 1 October 1941. During the Second Sino-Japanese War, he was assigned to Inner Mongolia to develop cavalry operations. In August 1941, Baba was promoted to lieutenant general.

With the start of World War II, Baba was assigned command of the IJA 53rd Division, a post which he held to 25 September 1943, when he was appointed commander of the IJA 4th Division in Sumatra. He subsequently became commander in chief of the IJA 37th Army based in Borneo.

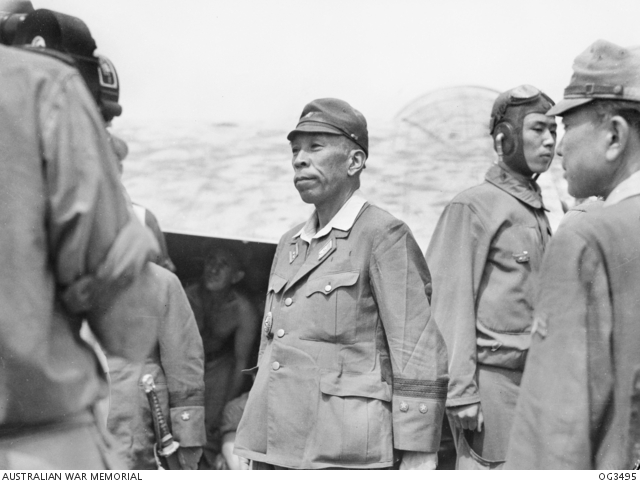
Baba (center) at Labuan airstrip to sign the surrender document at the 9th Division Headquarters, 10 September 1945

While in Borneo, Baba organized anti-guerrilla operation in the interior of the island. He was also military governor of Sabah from 26 December 1944 until 10 September 1945. The Allied reconquest of Borneo began on 1 May 1945 with the landing of the Australian Army at Tarakan, and with landings at Brunei and Labuan on 10 June. Japanese forces surrendered on 9 September, with General Baba formally turning over his sword to Major General George Wootten of the Australian 9th Division at Labuan on 10 September. Baba was officially discharged from the Imperial Japanese Army in April 1946.

Baba was arrested in January 1947 on suspicion of involvement in war crimes and brought to Rabaul for trial. Baba was charged with command responsibility for the Sandakan Death Marches, during which over 2,200 Australian and British prisoners of war perished. Evidence was presented at the trial that Baba was aware of the weakened condition of the prisoners, yet gave direct orders for the second march. The trial began on 28 May 1947 and was concluded eight days later on 5 June 1947 with a death sentence. Baba was executed by hanging on 7 August 1947.
