= USS Poinsett (AK-205) =

Cargo ship of the United States Navy

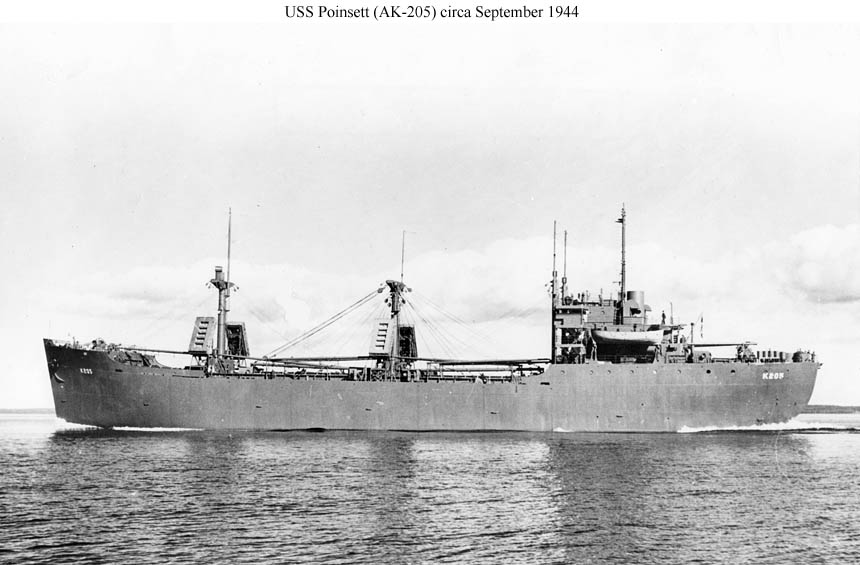
- USS Poinsett (AK-205) probably running builder's trials in the Great Lakes c. September, 1944

History

United States
- Name: Poinsett
- Namesake: Poinsett County, Arkansas
- Ordered: as type (C1-M-AV1) hull, MC hull 2159
- Builder: Leathem D. Smith Shipbuilding Company, Sturgeon Bay, Wisconsin
- Yard number: 325
- Laid down: 6 November 1943
- Launched: 22 May 1944
- Sponsored by: Mrs. Robert L. Rote
- Acquired: 22 January 1945
- Commissioned: 7 February 1945
- Decommissioned: 25 January 1946
- Stricken: 12 March 1946
- Identification: Hull symbol: AK-205; Code letters: NXNK
- Honors and awards: one battle star for World War II service
- Fate: Sold 25 February 1947, Bergenske Dampakibaselskab (Bergen Line)

History

Norway
- Name: Carina
- Owner: Bergenske Dampakibaselskab (Bergen Line)
- Acquired: 25 February 1947
- Fate: Sold

History

South Korea
- Name: Masan
- Namesake: City of Masan
- Fate: Scrapped, 1979

General characteristics
- Class & type: Alamosa-class cargo ship
- Type: C1-M-AV1
- Tonnage: 5,032 long tons deadweight (DWT)
- Displacement: 2,382 long tons (2,420 t) (standard); 7,450 long tons (7,570 t) (full load)
- Length: 388 ft 8 in (118.47 m)
- Beam: 50 ft (15 m)
- Draft: 21 ft 1 in (6.43 m)
- Installed power: 1 × Nordberg, TSM 6 diesel engine; 1,750 shp (1,300 kW)
- Propulsion: 1 × propeller
- Speed: 11.5 kn (21.3 km/h; 13.2 mph)
- Capacity: 3,945 t (3,883 long tons) DWT; 9,830 cu ft (278 m^{3}) (refrigerated); 227,730 cu ft (6,449 m^{3}) (non-refrigerated)
- Complement: 15 Officers; 70 Enlisted
- Armament: 1 × 3 in (76 mm)/50 caliber dual purpose gun (DP); 6 × 20 mm (0.8 in) Oerlikon anti-aircraft (AA) cannons

USS Poinsett (AK-205) was an Alamosa-class cargo ship acquired by the US Navy just prior to the end of World War II. She carried supplies and ammunition to the Pacific Ocean battle areas and was awarded one battle star for her operations in the Borneo area.

== Construction ==
Poinsett was laid down under US Maritime Commission (MARCOM) contract, MC hull 2158, by Leathem D. Smith Shipbuilding Company, Sturgeon Bay, Wisconsin, 6 November 1943; launched 22 May 1944; sponsored by Mrs. Robert L. Rote; acquired by the Navy 22 January 1945; and commissioned at Houston, Texas, 7 February 1945.

== Service history ==
=== World War II service ===
After shakedown off Galveston, Texas, Poinsett loaded ammunition at Theodore, Alabama, and departed for the Panama Canal 21 March. She steamed to Ulithi thence to Zamboanga, Philippine Islands, arriving 11 May.

After issuing ammunition there, she proceeded to Tawi Tawi, Sulu Archipelago, and joined the main forces for the invasion of Balikpapan (1 July). On 10 July she departed Borneo for Morotai and the Philippines, whence she sailed southeast to Manus. There, while loading fleet issue clothing and small stores, she received word of the war's end.

=== Post-war decommissioning ===
Poinsett then proceeded to Manila and Guiuan, Samar, to discharge her cargo. She departed 19 November for the Panama Canal and Norfolk, Virginia, for inactivation. Decommissioned 25 January 1946, she was returned to MARCOM, 29 January 1946, and her name was struck from the Navy List, 12 March 1946.

== Merchant service ==
On 25 February 1947, MARCOM sold Poinsett to Bergenske Dampakibaselskab (Bergen Line), of, Norway, for $693,862. She was reflagged for Norway and her name was changed to Carina.

She was subsequently sold to the Government of South Korea and renamed Masan. She was scrapped in 1979, in South Korea.

== Honors and awards ==
Poinsett received one battle star for World War II service:

- Borneo Campaign (1 to 10 July 1945)

== Notes ==
Citations

== Bibliography ==
Online resources

- "Poinsett (AK-205)". Dictionary of American Naval Fighting Ships. Naval History and Heritage Command. 24 August 2015. This article incorporates text from this source, which is in the public domain.
- "C1 Cargo Ships". www.ShipbuildingHistory.com. 28 August 2009.
- "Poinsett (AK-205)". NavSource. 12 December 2014.
- "Poinsett (AK-205)". United States Department of Transportation. Archived from the original on July 8, 2015.
