= USS Conner (DD-582) =

Fletcher-class destroyer

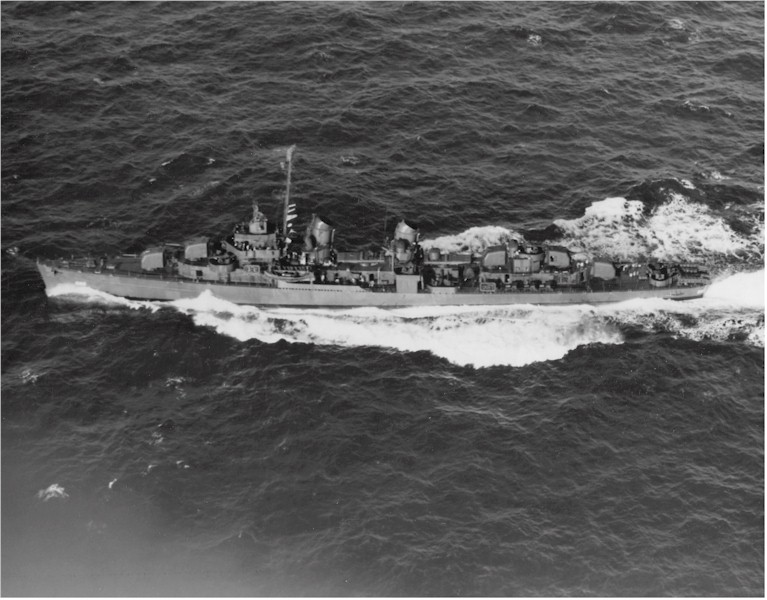
- USS Conner (DD-582)

History

United States
- Name: USS Conner (DD-582)
- Namesake: David Conner
- Builder: Boston Navy Yard
- Laid down: 6 April 1942
- Launched: 18 July 1942
- Sponsored by: Miss T.L. Conner
- Commissioned: 8 June 1943
- Decommissioned: 5 July 1946
- Stricken: 1 September 1975
- Fate: Transferred to Hellenic Navy, 15 September 1959

History

Greece
- Name: Aspis (D06)
- Acquired: 15 September 1959
- Stricken: 1991
- Fate: Sold for scrap, 1997

General characteristics
- Class & type: Fletcher-class destroyer
- Displacement: 2,050 tons
- Length: 376 ft 6 in (114.76 m)
- Beam: 39 ft 8 in (12.09 m)
- Draft: 13 ft 9 in (4.19 m)
- Propulsion: 60,000 shp (45 MW); 2 propellers
- Speed: 35 knots (65 km/h; 40 mph)
- Range: 6,500 nautical miles at 15 kt; (12,000 km at 30 km/h)
- Complement: 273
- Armament: 5 × 5 in./38 guns (127 mm), 4 × 40 mm AA guns, 4 × 20 mm AA guns, 10 × 21 in (53 cm) torpedo tubes, 6 × depth charge projectors, 2 × depth charge tracks

USS Conner (DD-582) was a Fletcher-class destroyer of the United States Navy, the second Navy ship to be named in honor of Commodore David Conner (1792–1856), who led U.S. Naval forces during the first part of the Mexican–American War.

Conner was launched on 18 July 1942 by the Boston Navy Yard, sponsored by Miss T.L. Conner; and commissioned on 8 June 1943.

== World War II ==
Conner arrived in Pearl Harbor from the east coast 19 September 1943, and joined the task force for the raid on Wake Island of 5 and 6 October. She put to sea again from Pearl Harbor 10 November for the invasion of the Gilberts, during which she screened aircraft carriers, and protected assault shipping as it unloaded. She bombarded Nauru Island on 8 December, and sailed to Efate, New Hebrides, from which she screened the air strikes on Kavieng, New Ireland, arriving at Funafuti 21 January 1944 to join the Fast Carrier Task Force (then the 5th Fleet's TF 58).

=== 1944 ===
Between 23 January and 26 February 1944, Conner operated in the Marshalls assaults. She screened carriers during air strikes on Kwajalein and Majuro and in the raids on Truk and the Marianas in February. Between 28 February and 20 March she guarded a convoy to Pearl Harbor, then rejoined the carriers for the raids on the Palaus, Yap, Ulithi, and Woleai from 30 March to 1 April. Returning to the Southwest Pacific, she joined in the shore bombardment of New Guinea as the Hollandia landings were prepared, and returned at the close of April to the carriers for the strikes on Truk, Satawan, and Ponape.

During the Marianas operation, Conner continued screening the carriers for the preliminary air strikes on Saipan, Tinian, and Guam, and the raids in the Bonins from 12 to 16 June 1944. As the massive air Battle of the Philippine Sea was fought on 19 and 20 June, she continued her screening, and at the close of the action acted as rescue ship for the carrier planes as they returned from their extreme range strikes on the retiring Japanese fleet. Her force then returned to strike from the air at Iwo Jima on 23 and 24 June and 3 and 4 July.

After repairs at Eniwetok, Conner put to sea with a carrier task group from 29 August to 28 September 1944, screening while her carriers launched strikes on the Palaus, Yap, Ulithi, Mindanao, and the Visayans, covering the landings on Morotai, and returning to the screen for air assaults on Luzon and the Visayans once again. On 2 October, she sailed from Manus to screen the carriers as they neutralized Japanese bases on Okinawa, northern Luzon, and Formosa in the final preparations for the assault on Leyte. On 13 October, in a furious attack by Japanese aircraft, Canberra was torpedoed, and Conner protected the damaged cruiser as she left the action area, splashing several enemy planes which tried to finish Canberra off. She rejoined the carriers for strikes on Luzon and Yap, and screened them in the Battle of Surigao Strait on 25 and 26 October as they launched strikes after Japanese ships fleeing from the epic Battle for Leyte Gulf.

=== 1945 ===
Conner remained in the Philippines, patrolling the Camotes Sea and Ormoc Bay against Japanese shipping and covering the landings at Mindoro until she put into Manus Island for replenishment 23 December. She returned to patrol the entrance to Lingayen Gulf covering the invasion landings of 9 and 10 January 1945, and on 29 January, cleared for overhaul at Puget Sound Navy Yard.

Returning to San Pedro Bay, Leyte, 16 May 1945, Conner sailed 6 June to guard minesweepers and underwater demolition teams at work in Brunei Bay, Borneo, in preparation for invasion. Conner joined in bombarding Brunei, and provided pinpoint gunfire support on call from the invading Australian troops from 10 to 17 June. From 1 to 9 July, she gave the same service in the invasion of Balikpapan. Returning to the Philippines 17 July, she joined Charrette for a patrol in the Netherlands East Indies. On 2 August they sighted a Japanese hospital ship Tachibana Maru, which they stopped for inspection. Discovering contraband and a large number of troops on board, they took the ship prize, and escorted her into Morotai 6 August.

A week later Conner sailed for Okinawa, and with the war at an end, arrived at Jinsen, Korea, 8 September 1945, Until 21 December, she served in the occupation of the Far East, cruising between Jinsen and Tsingtao and Shanghai. Returning to San Francisco 20 January 1946, she was decommissioned and placed in reserve at Long Beach 5 July 1946.

Conner received 12 battle stars for World War II service.

=== Operation Pettycoat ===
In the 1959 comedy movie, Operation Petticoat, Conner played the role of the American destroyer which attacks the USS Sea Tiger, following instructions to sink any "unidentified submarine, pink or otherwise." The film was set in the initial weeks of World War II, several months before Conner was actually built.

== Greek service ==
Following more than thirteen years in "mothballs", USS Conner was loaned to Greece 15 September 1959. Renamed Aspis (D06) ("Shield") and formally sold to Greece in 1977, she was part of the Hellenic Navy until stricken in the early 1991. The ship was sold for scrap in 1997.
