= USS Hart (DD-594) =

Fletcher-class destroyer

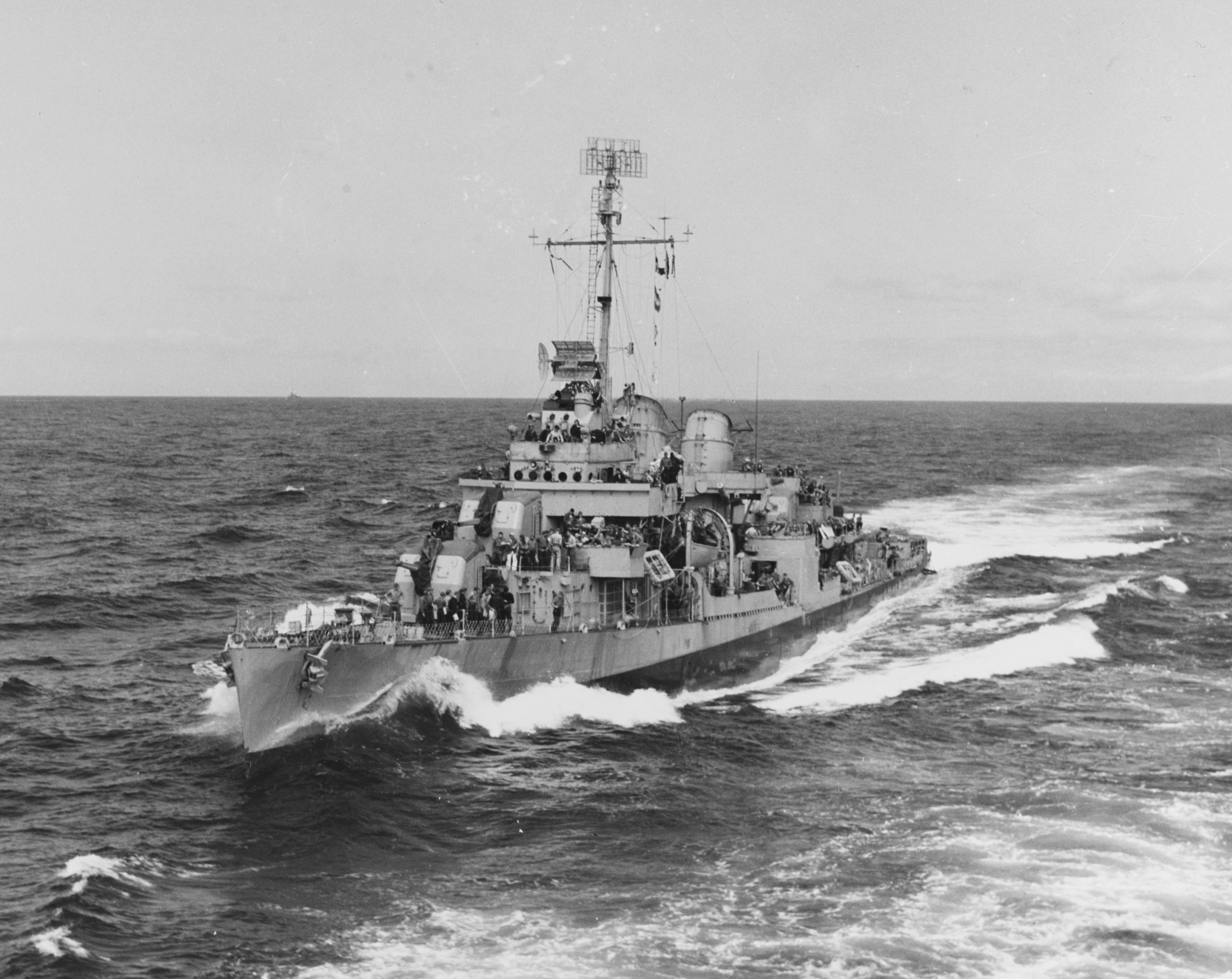
- USS Hart (DD-594) at sea on 24 March 1945.

History

United States
- Namesake: Patrick H. Hart
- Builder: Puget Sound Naval Shipyard
- Laid down: 10 August 1943
- Launched: 25 September 1944
- Commissioned: 4 November 1944
- Decommissioned: 31 May 1946
- Stricken: 15 April 1973
- Fate: Sold for scrap, 3 December 1973

General characteristics
- Class & type: Fletcher-class destroyer
- Displacement: 2,050 tons
- Length: 376 ft 6 in (114.7 m)
- Beam: 39 ft 8 in (12.1 m)
- Draft: 17 ft 9 in (5.4 m)
- Propulsion: 60,000 shp (45 MW); 2 propellers
- Speed: 35 knots (65 km/h; 40 mph)
- Range: 6500 nm at 15 kn (12,000 km at 28 km/h)
- Complement: 273
- Armament: 5 × 5-inch 38 caliber guns, 4 × 40 mm AA guns, 4 × 20 mm AA guns, 10 × 21 inch (533 mm) torpedo tubes, 6 × depth charge projectors, 2 × depth charge tracks

USS Hart (DD-594), a Fletcher-class destroyer, was the second ship of the United States Navy of that name, in honor of Lieutenant Patrick H. Hart (1912–1942), who posthumously received the Navy Cross for heroism during the Battle of Midway.

== Namesake ==
Patrick Henry Hart was born on 31 May 1915 in New York City. He graduated from the United States Naval Academy in 1937. He served on board USS Colorado and USS West Virginia before becoming a naval aviator in 1940. Appointed Lieutenant in 1942, he was killed on 4 June 1942 in the Battle of Midway while a member of Torpedo Squadron 3. He was posthumously awarded the Navy Cross for heroism in attacking the Japanese aircraft carriers.

== Construction and commissioning ==
Hart, originally designated Mansfield and renamed Hart 21 March 1944, was launched 25 September 1944 by Puget Sound Navy Yard; sponsored by Lieutenant Hart's mother, Mrs. Emma Hart; and commissioned 4 November 1944.

== Service history ==
Hart conducted her regular shakedown cruise off California and during her training participated in experimental high-speed refueling exercises with Kaskaskia. From 12 to 23 December, the destroyer refueled at sea some 50 times under all conditions of sea and weather gaining vital information on how to improve this key wartime operation. Ending her regular shakedown on 31 January 1945, the ship departed on 19 February for Pearl Harbor. From 27 February to 3 March she escorted Intrepid in gunnery and aircraft operations, departing for Ulithi on 5 March.

Arriving at Ulithi 16 March, Hart joined the assembled task forces for the Okinawa operation. From 24 March to 12 April, the ship was assigned as part of the screen for escort carriers furnishing close air support for the landings and preinvasion neutralization of neighboring Japanese air strips. Detached on 12 April, she assumed duty as an escort for transports for 2 days and then commenced protective patrol duties during landings near Okinawa.

Hart was detached from 5th Fleet on 19 April and proceeded to the Philippines to join 7th Fleet for the Borneo landings. She arrived off Brunei Bay on 9 June 1945 and commenced a patrol of the South China Sea to guard against possible interference from the remains of the Japanese Fleet at Singapore. Hart also carried out shore bombardment beginning 11 June in support of Australian troops landing at Brunei Bay. On 14 June, she shot down her first Japanese aircraft during an attempted bombing. During the period of 19–21 June, she provided close support for further landings on the coast of Borneo near Brunei Bay, and then departed for Balikpapan and other amphibious operations. While there, Hart patrolled, provided star shell illumination, and directed minesweeping vessels through the treacherous enemy minefields off the beaches. Australian troops went ashore on 1 July, under cover of fire from Hart and other ships; during the operation Hart destroyed two mines and a 75 mm gun emplacement ashore.

Temporarily leaving the landing areas, Hart was assigned as part of the escort for Major General Douglas MacArthur in Cleveland, steaming to Manila with the General and then proceeding to Leyte on 5 July. She next moved to Subic Bay for training exercises and escort duty, and after the surrender of Japan on 15 August was assigned to the newly formed North China Force.

Hart departed on 5 September 1945 to support the landing of Army occupation forces at Jinsen, Korea. The force threaded its way through many mines en route, and after arrival, Hart sent boarding parties on board Japanese merchantmen in the harbor for inspection and disarming. This duty completed, Hart sailed for China, escorting Cruiser Division 6 in an important show of force off the coast. She continued through the next few months to aid in the landings of American Marines, calling at Port Arthur, Tsingtao, and Taku.

The veteran destroyer sailed for the United States 9 February 1946, decommissioned 31 May 1946, and was placed in reserve at Long Beach, California. She was later moved to Mare Island Naval Shipyard, and then Stockton, California.

Hart was stricken from the Naval Vessel Register 15 April 1973, was sold on 3 December 1973, and broken up for scrap.

== Awards ==
Hart received two battle stars for her service in World War II.
