= USS Liddle (DE-206) =

Buckley-class destroyer escort

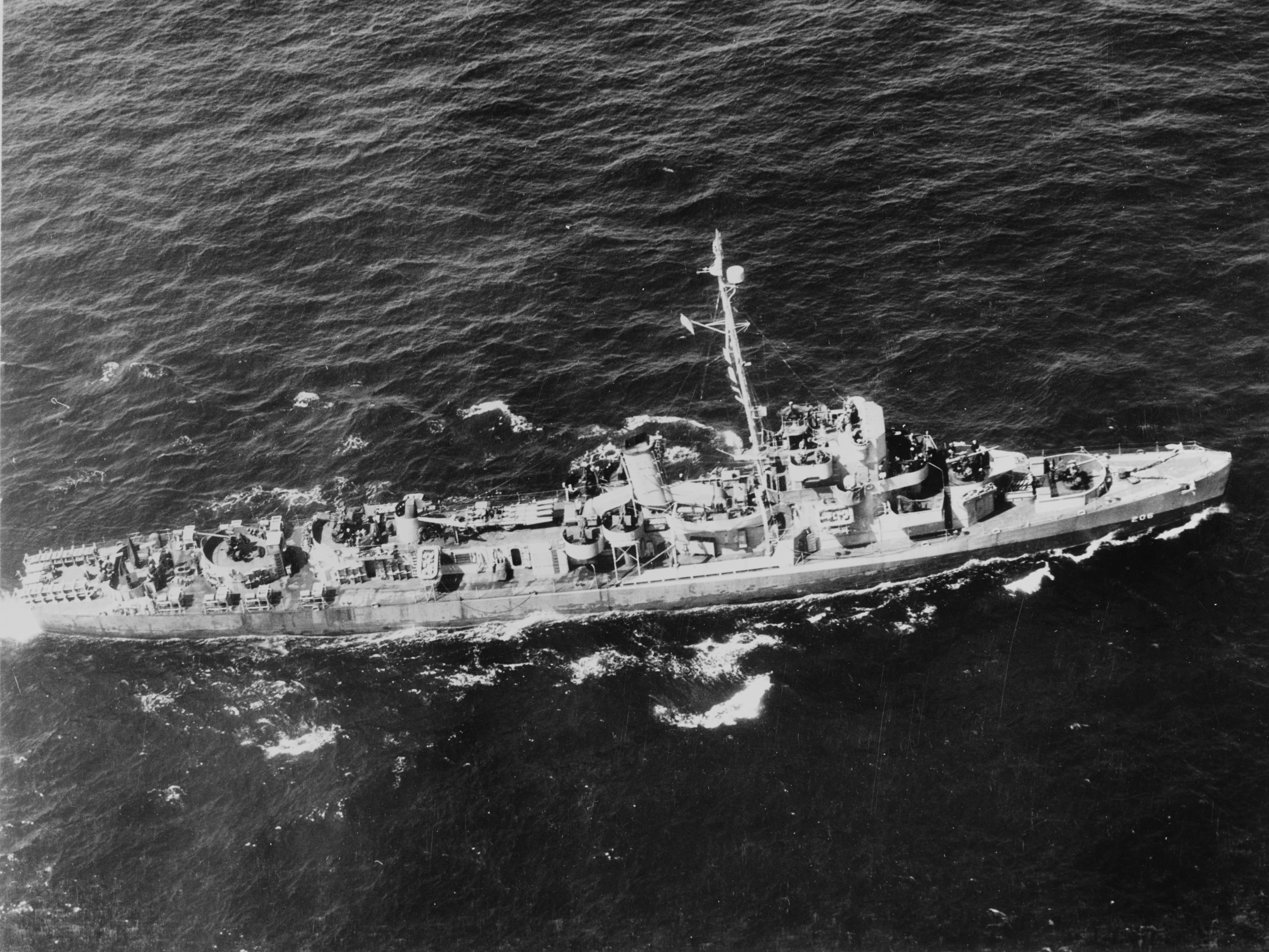
- USS Liddle (DE-206) on 3 May 1944

History

United States
- Name: USS Liddle
- Namesake: William P. Liddle
- Ordered: 1942
- Builder: Charleston Navy Yard
- Laid down: 8 June 1943
- Launched: 9 August 1943
- Commissioned: 6 December 1943
- Decommissioned: 18 June 1946
- Reclassified: APD-60, 5 July 1944
- Recommissioned: 27 October 1950
- Decommissioned: 2 February 1959
- Recommissioned: 29 November 1961
- Decommissioned: 18 March 1967
- Stricken: 5 April 1967
- Honors and awards: 4 battle stars (World War II)
- Fate: Sold for scrap, 25 June 1967

General characteristics
- Class & type: Buckley-class destroyer escort
- Displacement: 1,400 long tons (1,422 t) light; 1,740 long tons (1,768 t) standard
- Length: 306 ft (93 m)
- Beam: 37 ft (11 m)
- Draft: 9 ft 6 in (2.90 m) standard; 11 ft 3 in (3.43 m) full load
- Propulsion: 2 × boilers; General Electric turbo-electric drive; 12,000 shp (8.9 MW); 2 × solid manganese-bronze 3,600 lb (1,600 kg) 3-bladed propellers, 8 ft 6 in (2.59 m) diameter, 7 ft 7 in (2.31 m) pitch; 2 × rudders; 359 tons fuel oil
- Speed: 23 knots (43 km/h; 26 mph)
- Range: 3,700 nmi (6,900 km) at 15 kn (28 km/h; 17 mph); 6,000 nmi (11,000 km) at 12 kn (22 km/h; 14 mph)
- Complement: 15 officers, 198 men
- Armament: 3 × 3"/50 caliber guns; 1 × quad 1.1"/75 caliber gun; 8 × single 20 mm guns; 1 × triple 21 inch (533 mm) torpedo tubes; 1 × Hedgehog anti-submarine mortar; 8 × K-gun depth charge projectors; 2 × depth charge tracks

USS Liddle (DE-206/APD-60), a Buckley-class destroyer escort of the United States Navy, in service from 1943 to 1946. She was recommissioned from 1950 to 1959 and from 1961 to 1967, before being sold for scrap.

== History ==
Liddle was named in honor of Pharmacist's Mate Third Class William P. Liddle (1919–1942), who was killed in action, while serving with the 1st Marine Division, during the Battle of Guadalcanal on 19 August 1942. He was posthumously awarded the Silver Star.

Liddle was laid down by Charleston Navy Yard on 8 June 1943; launched on 9 August 1943; sponsored by Mrs. William Porter Liddle, mother of Pharmacist's Mate Third Class William Porter Liddle Jr.; and commissioned on 6 December 1943.

=== 1944–1946 ===
Between 11 February and 29 June 1944 Liddle escorted convoys on three round trips across the North Atlantic from New York City to Wales, Gibraltar, and Tunisia. Upon returning to New York she was converted to a Charles Lawrence class high speed transport and reclassified APD-60 on 5 July.

Departing New York on 22 September, she arrived Hollandia, New Guinea, on 4 November for duty with the 7th Fleet. She left New Guinea on 17 November to screen a supply convoy bound for Leyte Gulf, Philippine Islands, and arrived off the beaches on 24 November. On the same day she got underway to escort an LST formation to the Palaus, and returned to Leyte on 29 November.

Liddle embarked 141 troops on 6 December for a flanking operation in the Leyte Gulf area. After landing her troops at Ormoc without casualty on 7 December, Liddle came under attack from Japanese aircraft. Though splashing five attackers, she was hit on the bridge by a kamikaze and seriously damaged, necessitating her return to San Francisco on 16 January 1945 for repairs. While she was being refitted, a sign on her quarterdeck read: "This Ship Lost 38 Officers and Men. She is Anxious to Get Back Into Action."

By 22 February the ship was again underway to rejoin her division in liberating the Philippines. From 29 March to 5 June Liddle escorted convoys and trained for future landings. She then transported Australian troops to the Netherlands East Indies, and supported the landings at Brunei Bay on 10 June and Balikpapan on 1 July.

The ship next trained forces for the assault on the Japanese homeland, but the news of Japan's surrender ended this task. Liddle transported equipment to Korea through the mine-infested waters of the East China and Yellow Seas in September 1945, evacuated prisoners of war from Dairen, Manchuria, on 5 October, and became the Port Director Ship at Taku, China, on 25 October.

She got underway from Taku for the United States on 23 November, touched New York New Year's Day 1946, and two days later headed for Green Cove Springs, Florida, where she decommissioned 18 June 1946 and entered the Atlantic Reserve Fleet.

=== 1950–1959 ===
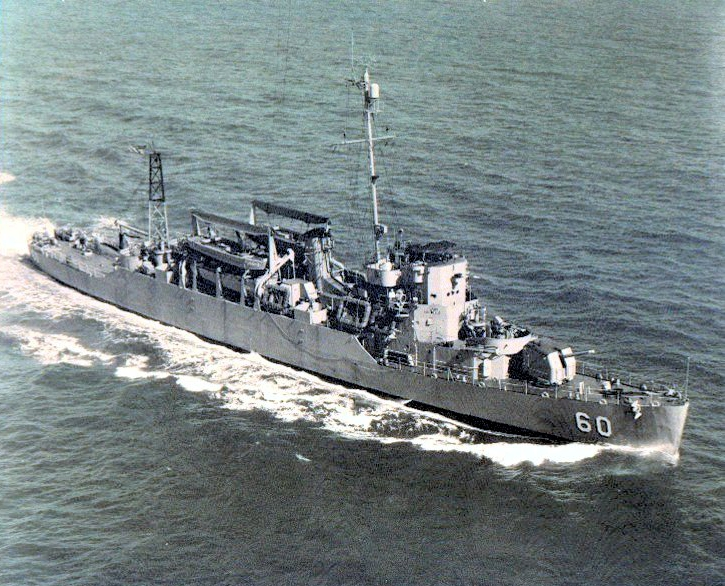
Liddle in the 1950s.

Liddle recommissioned on 27 October 1950 during the Korean War. Departing Green Cove Springs on 25 November, she arrived Norfolk, Virginia, two days later to join Transport Division 22. From late April 1951 to June, the ship participated in amphibious training which included convoy exercises to the North Atlantic. She departed Norfolk on 16 June for service with the 6th Fleet in the Mediterranean for reconnaissance work and amphibious exercises. She resumed landing training after returning to Little Creek on 1 October.

Liddle voyaged to the Panama Canal early in January 1952, and spent the spring and summer operating in the Caribbean. Back at Little Creek on 13 November, the fast transport intensified her tight training schedule. The need in Korea for troops with amphibious experience brought the ship to Boston in January 1953, to the Caribbean the next month, and returned her to Little Creek operations for the remainder of the summer. She sailed for the Mediterranean on 28 September to take part in "Operation Weldfast" which was a joint United Kingdom, Greek, Italian, Turkish, and United States landing exercise. Departing Oran, Algeria, on 23 January 1954, Liddle returned to Little Creek on 4 February where she became an ASW schoolship, engaged in more amphibious exercises, and conducted midshipman cruises. The ship departed Little Creek on 16 March 1955 and arrived at her new home port, New Orleans, on 21 March to take up duties as a reserve training ship. She became a unit of Reserve Escort Squadron 4, on 15 January 1958, and decommissioned on 2 February 1959.

=== 1961–1967 ===
In August 1961 the Berlin Crisis brought Liddle to active duty once again. She recommissioned on 29 November, Lt. Comdr. Royal R. Ross . As a unit of the Atlantic Amphibious Force, the ship resumed training which included a demonstration landing for President Kennedy off Onslow Beach, North Carolina, on 14 April 1962.

During the Cuban Missile Crisis from 24 October to 20 November 1962, she patrolled off the Bahama Islands to enforce American demands for the removal of Russian offensive weapons from Cuban soil. She then returned to her training exercises, and February 1963 was underway as a unit of Amphibious Squadron 8, part of the Caribbean Ready Squadron. Operating between Little Creek and the Caribbean, Liddle participated in a mercy mission to Haiti from 13 to 19 October 1963 to deliver food, clothing, and medical supplies to the coastal areas struck by Hurricane Flora. From 1964 through 1966 her continuing service along the Atlantic coast and in the Caribbean represented the constant effort of the Navy to maintain a high degree of training and efficiency in case of a national emergency.

Liddle decommissioned on 18 March 1967 at Norfolk; her name was struck from the Navy List on 5 April; and she was put up for disposal. On the day she decommissioned, her former crew immediately manned USS Beverly W. Reid, which recommissioned that day. Liddle was sold on 25 June 1967 to the North American Smelting Company.
