= Thirty-Seventh Army (Japan) =

Army of the Imperial Japanese Army during World War II

Japanese Thirty-Seventh Army
- Active: 11 April 1942 – 15 August 1945
- Country: Empire of Japan
- Branch: Imperial Japanese Army
- Type: Infantry
- Role: Corps
- Garrison/HQ: Kuching, Sarawak
- Nicknames: Nada (灘, Bay)
- Engagements: Borneo campaign

The Japanese 37th Army (第37軍, Dai-sanjyūnana gun) was an army of the Imperial Japanese Army during World War II.

== History ==
The Japanese 37th Army was formed as the Borneo Defence Army, a garrison force organised on 11 April 1942 under the Southern Expeditionary Army Group following the Japanese invasion and occupation of the British protectorates of Sarawak, Brunei, North Borneo on the island of Borneo.

On 12 September 1944, with the threat of possible landings of Allied forces to retake the former colonial territories in Southeast Asia increasing, the organisational structure of the Southern Expeditionary Army Group changed, and the Borneo Defence Army was re-designated the Japanese Thirty-Seventh Army.

The Japanese 37th Army was undermanned and poorly equipped, with most equipment and experienced units shifted toward more critical areas of the Southwest Pacific front. Nonetheless, it put up a stiff resistance to landings by Australian troops in the Borneo campaign of 1945, notably during the Battle of North Borneo.

The Japanese 37th Army was demobilised at the surrender of Japan on 15 August 1945 at Kuching.

== List of commanders ==
=== Commanding officer ===
	Name	From	To	
1	General Toshinari Maeda	11 April 1942	5 September 1942	Borneo Defence Army
2	General Masataka Yamawaki	5 September 1942	22 September 1944	Borneo Defence Army
3	Lieutenant General Masao Baba	26 December 1944	September 1945	Japanese 37th Army

=== Chief of Staff ===
	Name	From	To	
1	Major General Satoshi Makoto	11 April 1942	22 September 1944	Borneo Defence Army
2	Lieutenant General Keishin Managi	22 September 1944	24 February 1945	Japanese 37th Army
3	Major General Shigeru Kuroda	24 February 1945	September 1945	Japanese 37th Army

== See also ==
- Borneo campaign (1945) order of battle
- Batu Lintang camp
