= Daniel E. Barbey =

United States Navy admiral

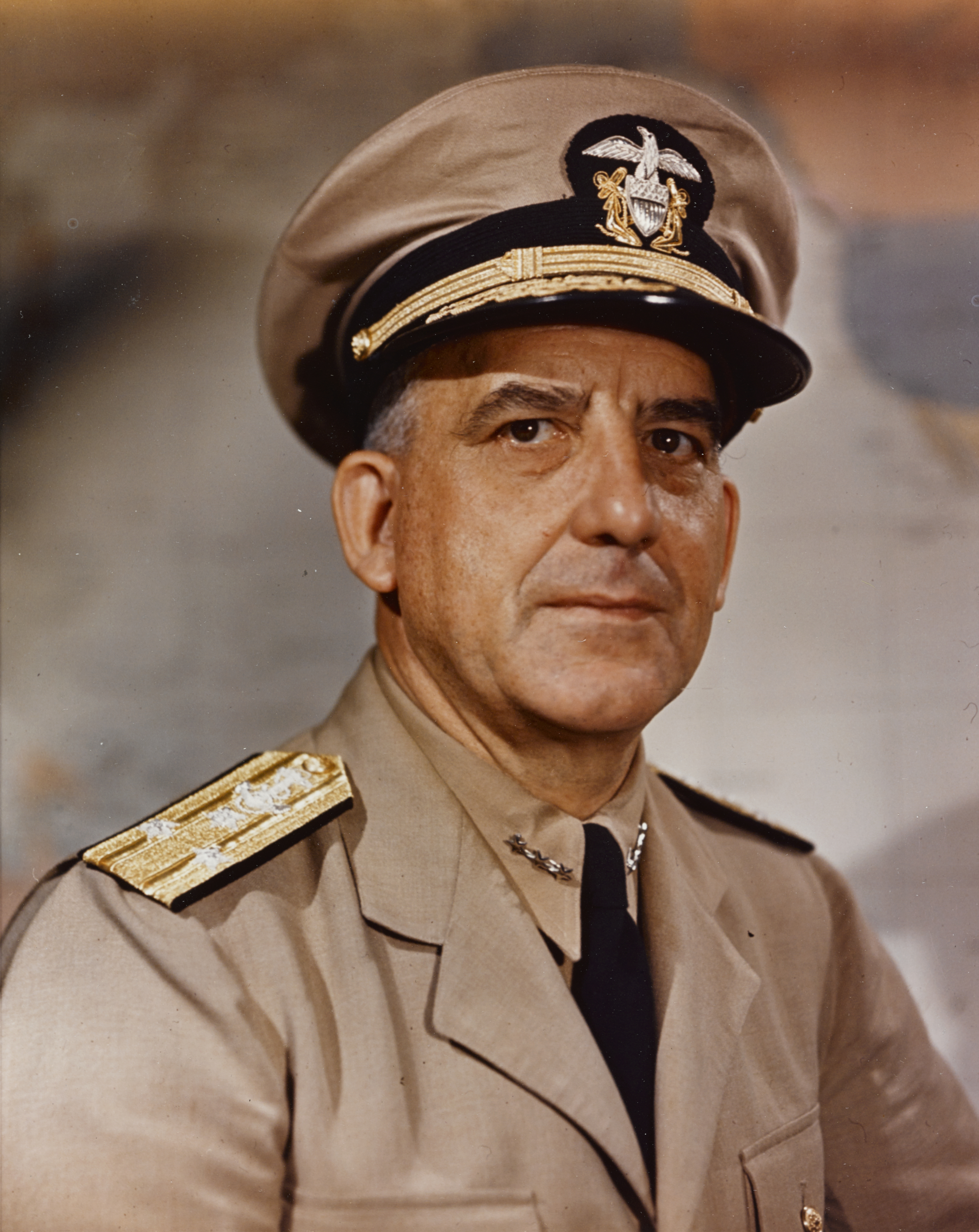
- Barbey in 1945
- Born: 23 December 1889; Portland, Oregon, United States
- Died: 11 March 1969 (aged 79); Bremerton, Washington, United States
- Military career
- Allegiance: United States of America
- Branch: United States Navy
- Service years: 1912–1951
- Rank: Vice admiral
- Nickname: "Uncle Dan"
- Service number: O-7930
- Commands: Caribbean Sea Frontier; Fourth Fleet; Seventh Fleet; VII Amphibious Force; USS New York; USS Ramapo; USS Lea; USS Lawrence
- Conflicts: Banana Wars; Nicaraguan intervention; Occupation of Veracruz; World War I; Russian Civil War; Greco-Turkish War; World War II; Operation Cartwheel; Woodlark–Kiriwina campaign; Salamaua–Lae campaign; New Britain campaign; Battle of Arawe; Battle of Cape Gloucester; Admiralty Islands campaign; Western New Guinea campaign; Philippine campaign; Battle of Leyte; Battle of Mindanao; Borneo campaign; Operation Blacklist Forty; Chinese Civil War; Operation Beleaguer
- Awards: Navy Cross; Navy Distinguished Service Medal (2); Army Distinguished Service Medal; Legion of Merit; Commander of the Order of the British Empire (Australia)

Vice Admiral Daniel Edward Barbey (23 December 1889 – 11 March 1969) was an officer in the United States Navy who served in World War I and World War II. A graduate of the Naval Academy, he participated in the 1912 United States occupation of Nicaragua and the 1915 United States occupation of Veracruz. While serving with the War Plans Section of the Bureau of Navigation in Washington, D.C. between the World Wars, developed an interest in amphibious warfare. In 1940 he produced Fleet Training Publication 167 – Landing Operations Doctrine, United States Navy, which would become the Navy's "bible" of amphibious operations, and would remain in use throughout World War II.

As commander Amphibious Force, Atlantic Fleet in 1940 and 1941 he supervised amphibious training and conducted Fleet Landing Exercises. In May 1942, Barbey was appointed to organize a new Amphibious Warfare Section within the Navy Department, which was charged with responsibility for the coordination of amphibious training and the development and production of the new generation of landing craft. In January 1943 he assumed command of Amphibious Force, Southwest Pacific Force, which became the VII Amphibious Force. He planned and carried out 56 amphibious assaults in the Southwest Pacific Area between September 1943 and July 1945. After the war, he commanded the Seventh Fleet and Fourth Fleet.

== World War I ==
Daniel Edward Barbey was born in Portland, Oregon on 23 December 1889. He graduated from the Naval Academy and was commissioned an ensign in June 1912. His Naval Academy classmates included future Admirals Elliot Buckmaster, Louis E. Denfield, Charles P. Mason, Charles A. Lockwood, Alfred E. Montgomery, DeWitt C. Ramsey, Mahlon Tisdale, Louis Wenzell, and Carleton F. Wright. His first assignment was aboard the armored cruiser USS California, which participated in the 1912 United States occupation of Nicaragua. In May 1914 he was transferred to the destroyer USS Lawrence as engineering officer, participating in the United States occupation of Veracruz. He remained on Lawrence, where he was promoted to lieutenant (junior grade) on 8 June 1915, serving first as engineering officer, and later as executive officer and commanding officer. In October 1916 he became engineering officer of the gunboat USS Annapolis, serving in Central American and Mexico waters. He received a Letter of Commendation from the Secretary of the Navy for the ship's service during the Mexican Revolution. Barbey was involved in the fitting out of the destroyer USS Stevens from December 1917 to May 1918, becoming its executive officer when it was commissioned on 24 May. Under an accelerated wartime promotion system, he was promoted to Lieutenant on 8 June 1918.

== Between the wars ==
Barbey was assigned to the Naval Base at Cardiff, Wales in January 1919, becoming the Naval Port Officer at Cardiff from July to August 1919, when he was transferred to the U.S. Naval Headquarters in London. In November 1919 he became Naval Port Officer, Constantinople, Turkey. In October 1920, he also became operations officer and flag secretary to Rear Admiral Mark L. Bristol, Commander U.S. Naval Detachment in Turkish Waters and High Commissioner to Turkey. Barbey ceased to be Naval Port Officer in July 1921, but continued as flag secretary to Admiral Bristol. During this time, Barbey served as the U.S. delegate on the Allied Commission for the Control of Trade with Turkey and as an observer with the White Army in the Crimea.

Returning to the U.S. in February 1922, he served briefly on the cargo ship USS Capella before becoming assistant engineering officer of the battleship USS Oklahoma in the Pacific. He was promoted to lieutenant commander on 15 October 1922. Continuing the pattern of alternating duty afloat and ashore, he then spent two years as Officer in Charge of the Portland Navy Recruiting Station, before returning to the Atlantic as engineering officer of the light cruiser USS Cincinnati in June 1925. From February 1927 to June 1928, he was executive officer of the oil tanker USS Ramapo. He then spent the next three years as aide to the Superintendent of the U.S. Naval Academy, Rear Admiral Samuel S. Robison. From June 1931 to June 1933 he commanded the destroyer USS Lea. He then spent two years as an inspector of ordnance at the Mare Island Naval Ammunition Depot in California, where he was promoted to the rank of commander in September 1933. In February 1935, he was posted to the battleship USS New York as damage control officer. He briefly commanded the Ramapo before becoming Commander of Destroyer Division 17 in the Pacific.

In June 1937 Barbey was assigned to War Plans Section of the Bureau of Navigation in Washington, D.C. During this assignment, he worked on mobilization plans, and developed an interest in amphibious warfare from studying reports of Japanese amphibious operations in the Second Sino-Japanese War. He was particularly intrigued by photographs of special landing craft with hinged bow ramps. In 1940 he produced Fleet Training Publication 167 – Landing Operations Doctrine, United States Navy (FTP 167). This would become the Navy's "bible" of amphibious operations, and would remain in use throughout World War II. He was promoted to captain in February 1940.

== World War II ==
=== Amphibious warfare ===
Barbey assumed command of New York in the Pacific but in January 1941 he returned to the Atlantic to become Chief of Staff to Rear Admiral Randall Jacobs, Commander Service Force, Atlantic Fleet. This included the embryo Amphibious Force, Atlantic Fleet. In 1940 and 1941 he supervised the amphibious training of the 1st Marine Division and the 1st Infantry Division, conducting Fleet Landing Exercises along the coast of North Carolina. In May 1942, Admiral Ernest King, Commander in Chief U.S. Fleet appointed Barbey to organize a new Amphibious Warfare Section within the Navy Department. Barbey was charged with responsibility for the coordination of amphibious training and the burgeoning amphibious craft construction program. He became involved with the development and production of the new generation of landing craft. He was promoted to the rank of rear admiral in December 1942.

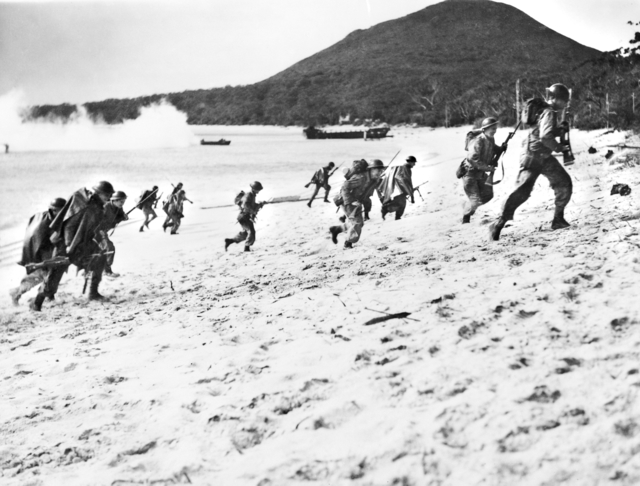
Troops and landing craft crews training at HMAS Assault at Port Stephens

On 8 January 1943 Barbey assumed command of Amphibious Force, Southwest Pacific Force. He established his headquarters aboard the attack transport (APA) USS Henry T. Allen on the Brisbane River and set about building up his small training command into a major amphibious force capable of carrying out the strategy of the Supreme Commander, Southwest Pacific Area (SWPA), General Douglas MacArthur, for an amphibious advance from Australia to the Philippines. On 15 March 1943, "by a stroke of Admiral King's pen," the Southwest Pacific Force became the Seventh Fleet and its Amphibious Force became the VII Amphibious Force. On meeting Barbey for the first time, MacArthur had only one question: "are you a lucky officer?"

The VII Amphibious Force inherited the Royal Australian Navy amphibious training center HMAS Assault at Port Stephens, New South Wales and a Combined Training School at Bribie Island and nearby Toorbul Point in Queensland. There was only one APA, the Henry T. Allen, which was in a poor state of repair and trailed an oil slick wherever it went, precluding its use in a combat zone, but VII Amphibious Force had three Australian assault transports, known as Landing Ships, Infantry (LSI): HMAS Manoora, Kanimbla and Westralia. For the moment, they were too valuable to risk in forward areas. They were augmented by a flotilla each of the new beaching craft, Landing Ships, Tank (LST), Landing Craft, Infantry (LCI) and Landing Craft, Tank (LCT). There were also a small number of high speed transports (APD). MacArthur directed that the two navies would use a common doctrine, FTP 167. However, this was written with the assumption that APDs would be available and carry beach parties. Doctrine therefore required modification from the start.

=== New Guinea campaign ===
Operation Chronicle, the landings at Kiriwina and Woodlark Islands, was the VII Amphibious Force's first operation, presented no great difficulty as the islands were known to be unoccupied. However half the assault troops experienced seasickness, problems were encountered with clearing the sand bar at the entrance to Guasopa Harbor, and Barbey's decision to land at night and withdraw before dawn in order to avoid encountering Japanese aircraft highlighted the inexperience of his crews and deficiencies in their training. Unloading activities on the coral-fringed Kiriwina dragged on for a fortnight.

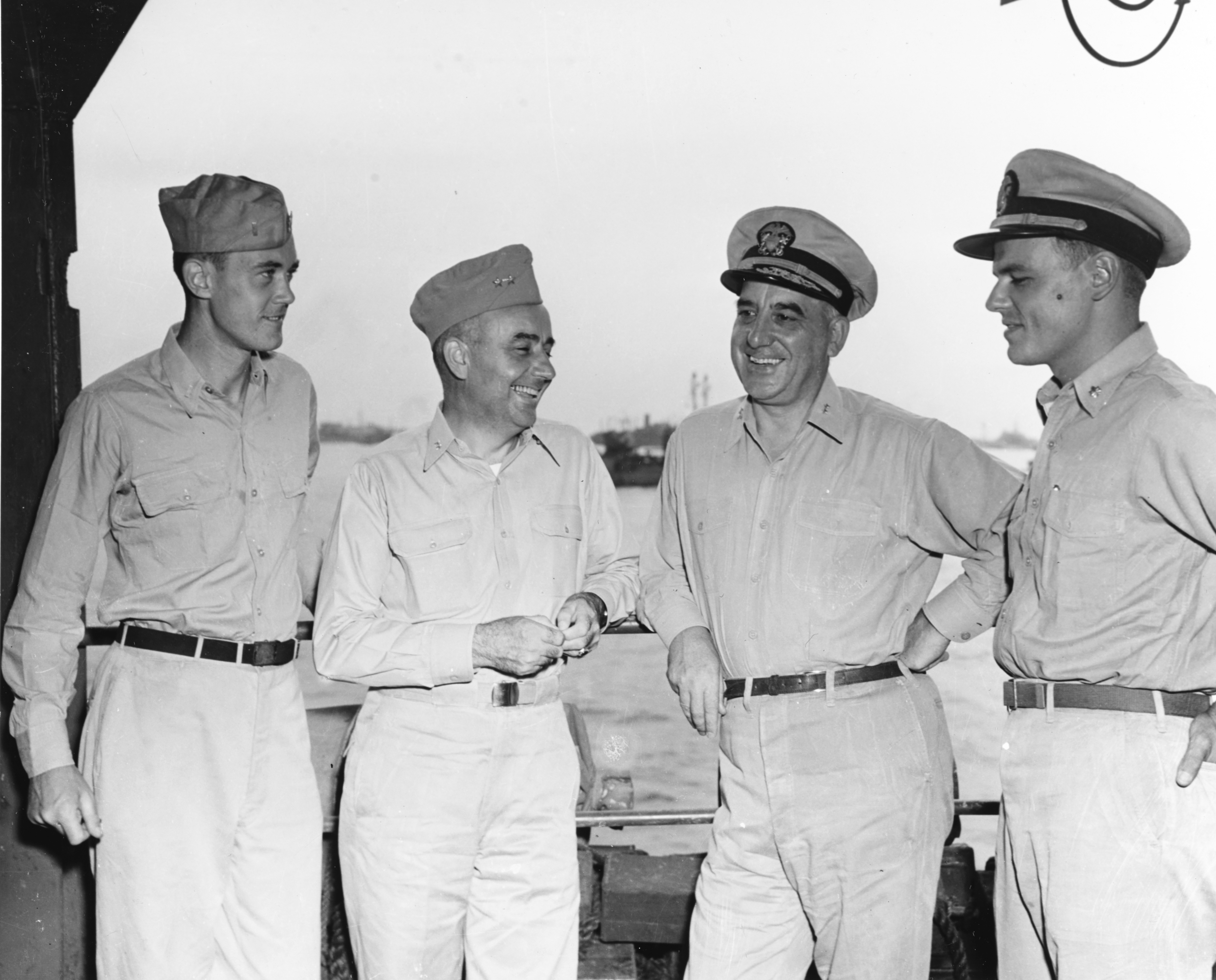
From left to right: Lieutenant May, Rear Admiral Arthur D. Struble, Barbey, and Lieutenant Commander William S. Mailliard; in Hollandia, New Guinea, November 1944.

For the landing at Lae, Barbey elected to make a night approach and a dawn landing. As the LCIs approached the beach, they were set upon by three Mitsubishi G4M "Betty" bombers which score a bomb hit and two near misses on USS LCI-339. Badly damaged and riddled by strafing bullets and fragments, the ship was beached but became a total loss. That afternoon, six LSTs were attacked by a force of about 80 Japanese aircraft. Some 48 Lockheed P-38 Lightnings were vectored to assist but USS LST-471 and USS LST-473 were hit, killing 57 crewmen and Australian troops.

A few weeks later Barbey was called upon to make a landing at Finschhafen. Not confident of the promised air support, Barbey decided to make another night landing, with the landing ships clearing the beach before dawn. Major General George Wootten, the commander of the assault troops, doubted that the VII Amphibious Force could find the correct beach in the dark, and was proven correct by events; the VII Amphibious Force was not yet proficient enough to conduct night landings. Fortunately, this time Japanese air attacks failed to sink or damage any amphibious ships. For his part in the landings at Lae and Finschhafen, Barbey was awarded the Navy Cross. His citation read:

The President of the United States of America takes pleasure in presenting the Navy Cross to Rear Admiral Daniel Edward Barbey (NSN: 0–7930), United States Navy, for extraordinary heroism and distinguished service in the line of his profession as Commander, Amphibious Force, Seventh Fleet, during attacks on Japanese-occupied Lae and Finschafen in New Guinea, on 4 September and 22 September 1943. With singular skill and inspiring courage, Rear Admiral Barbey personally led his forces to the beachheads under relentless air attacks and expertly directed the brilliantly executed landings which ultimately resulted in victory to our forces. The sound tactical knowledge, fearless leadership and inspiring devotion to duty displayed by Rear Admiral Barbey were in keeping with the highest traditions of the United States Naval Service.

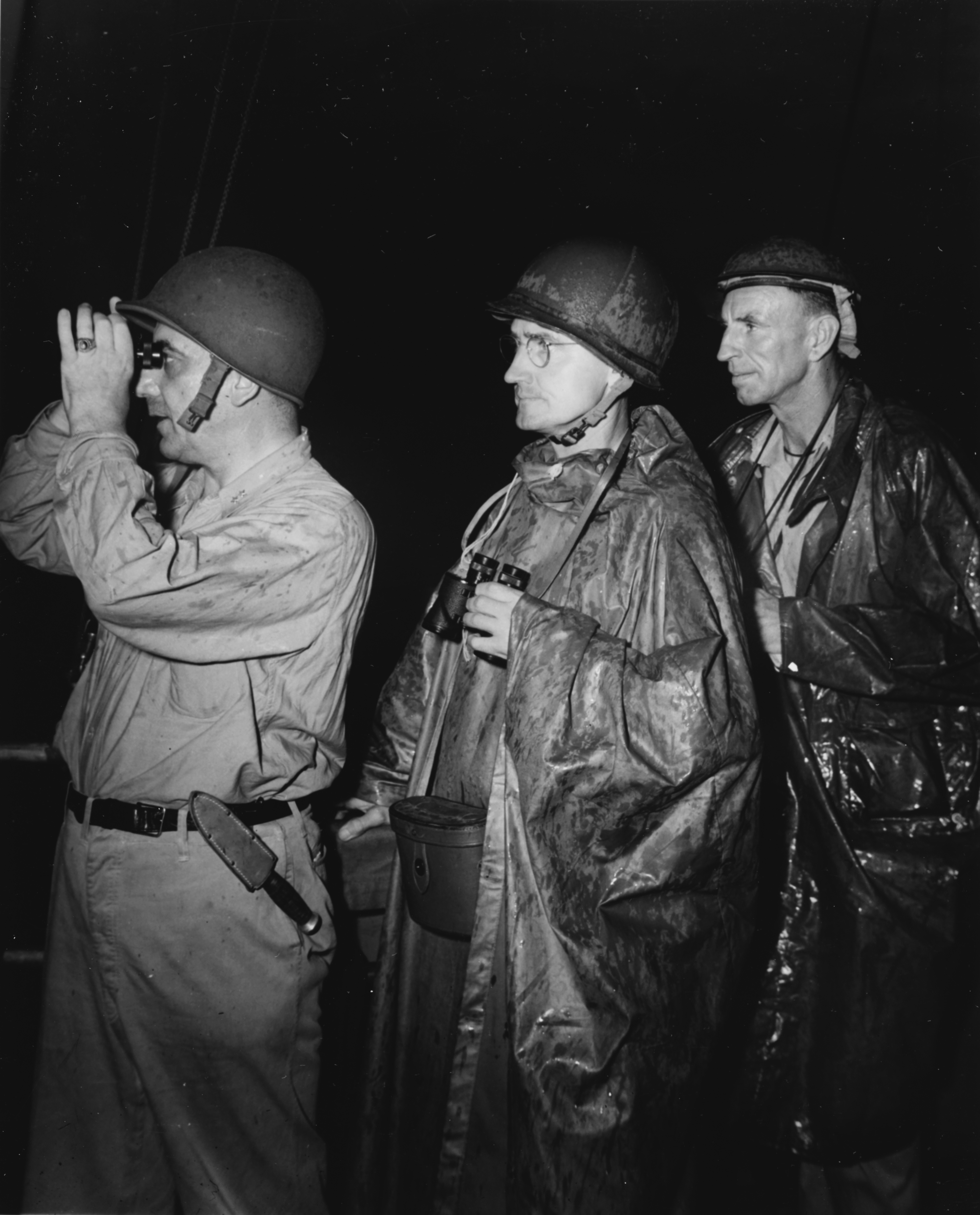
Barbey, Brigadier General Clarence A. Martin and Brigadier Ronald Hopkins observe the landing at Saidor.

The Battle of Arawe and the Battle of Cape Gloucester involved a number of "firsts" for the VII Amphibious Force. It marked the first use of an Australian LSI, HMAS Westralia, in combat, and the first appearance in SWPA of a Landing Ship, Dock (LSD), USS Carter Hall. The LSD was used to carry amtracs, also making their debut in SWPA, which were necessary to cross the coral reefs. Fire support was provided by two LCIs equipped with rockets. This proved so successful that Barbey had another six modified for the purpose. Casualties were evacuated using specially modified LCTs and LSTS equipped as hospital ships. For the first time, Beach Party 1 participated, providing a fully trained naval beach party for the first time. Contrary to doctrine, it was not affiliated with a particular APA. The Arawe operation also saw the first use of another innovation of Barbey's, the landing craft control officers. However, an attempt to land a force in rubber boats was a total failure, and was not repeated. Afterward, Barbey received his first properly equipped amphibious command ship, the USS Blue Ridge. He also acquired an experienced deputy in Rear Admiral William M. Fechteler. Fechteler commanded the assault on the Admiralty Islands, in which APDs were employed in order to meet the Army's requirement for a reconnaissance in force.

=== Western New Guinea campaign ===
During Operations Reckless and Persecution, Barbey personally directed the landing at Tanahmerah Bay. The beaches there proved to be unsuitable, and Barbey diverted the follow-up forces to Humboldt Bay. MacArthur told war correspondent Frazier Hunt that Barbey was "just about the number one amphibious commander in the world," but Admiral Chester Nimitz was more critical. VII Amphibious Force carried nearly 80,000 personnel, 50,000 tons (56,000 m^{3}) of stores and 3,000 vehicles to the area but the resulting accumulation of stores on and immediately behind the beach included dumps in which fuel and ammunition were stored together. A lone Japanese aircraft bombed a dump and set off fires and explosions. Twenty men were killed and over a hundred wounded, and twelve LST loads of stores were destroyed. Meanwhile, three Japanese bombers attacked and torpedoed the cargo ship USS Etamin. The ship was severely damaged and towed back to Finschhafen with half its cargo still on board. For these operations, Barbey was awarded the Navy Distinguished Service Medal. His citation read:

The President of the United States of America takes pleasure in presenting the Navy Distinguished Service Medal to Rear Admiral Daniel Edward Barbey (NSN: 0–7930), United States Navy, for exceptionally meritorious and distinguished services to the Government of the United States, in a duty of great responsibility as Commander of the Amphibious Forces of the Seventh Fleet from 8 January 1943 to 12 May 1944. Skillfully building and developing an organization from men and material untried in battle, Rear Admiral Barbey succeeded in bringing the forces under his command to the high state of combat readiness within a few months which enabled them to enter upon the New Guinea operation at the peak of their efficiency. Working in closest cooperation with associated Army Commanders and ably planning for determined aggression, he aided essentially in overcoming Japanese resistance during numerous landing operations and rendered invaluable support for forces until they were firmly established in various strategic positions in this vital area. An inspiring and forceful leader, Rear Admiral Barbey contributed immeasurably to the success of the campaigns in New Britain, New Guinea and the Admiralties and his brilliant administration of exacting responsibilities throughout this period reflects the highest credit upon the United States Naval Service.

=== Philippines campaign ===
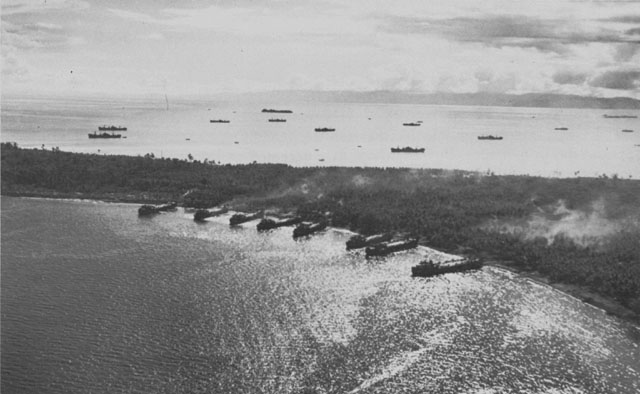
LSTs landing supplies at Blue Beach, Morotai

Barbey paid a visit to Washington, D.C. in June 1944 to discuss his needs but his trip was mistimed, for the Joint Chiefs of Staff had left for Europe to observe the Invasion of Normandy and Barbey had to wait for Admiral King to return. In their discussions, King emphasised that it was his intention that MacArthur's advance would proceed no further than Mindanao. This was scuttled in September 1944 by his own admirals, who recommended a descent on Leyte. By July enough amphibious ships had arrived in SWPA to allow Barbey to divide the VII Amphibious Force. Fechteler assumed command of Amphibious Group 8, while Amphibious Group 9 was formed under Rear Admiral Arthur D. Struble. In 1945, a third group, Amphibious Group 6, was formed under Rear Admiral Forrest B. Royal. For the invasion of Leyte, MacArthur and his naval commander, Vice Admiral Thomas C. Kinkaid expected that Barbey would continue in command of the amphibious forces, but Nimitz preferred the commander of the III Amphibious Force, Vice Admiral Theodore S. Wilkinson, who was senior and in Nimitz's opinion, more experienced. In the end, a compromise was reached, with both amphibious forces participating, and Kinkaid in overall command. For his part, Barbey was awarded a second Navy Distinguished Service Medal. His citation read:

The President of the United States of America, authorized by Act of Congress, 9 July 1918, takes pleasure in presenting a Gold Star in lieu of a Second Award of the Navy Distinguished Service Medal to Vice Admiral Daniel Edward Barbey (NSN: 0–7930), United States Navy, for exceptionally meritorious and distinguished services to the Government of the United States, in a duty of great responsibility as Commander of the Amphibious Forces of the Seventh Fleet, in action against enemy Japanese forces in the Southwest Pacific Area from 2 July 1944 to 1 February 1945. Initiating a series of ably executed operations, Vice Admiral Barbey and the intrepid forces under his command effected successful surprise landings at Noemfoor on 2 July, at Sansapor on 30 July, and at Morotai on 15 September 1944, thereby establishing Southwest Pacific Air Forces within effective striking distance of the Philippines. As Commander of the Northern Attack Force at Leyte on 20 October, he participated with distinction in the highly successful operation which gained lodgment for our forces in the Philippine Islands and, as Commander of the Northern Attack Force at Lingayen Gulf on 9 January 1945, he again shared equally with the Commander Southern Attack Force the credit for the brilliant amphibious operation which finally assured the re-conquest of Luzon and the Philippine Archipelago. By his inspiring leadership and outstanding performance of duty in the planning and execution of these vital operations, Vice Admiral Barbey upheld the highest traditions of the United States Naval Service.

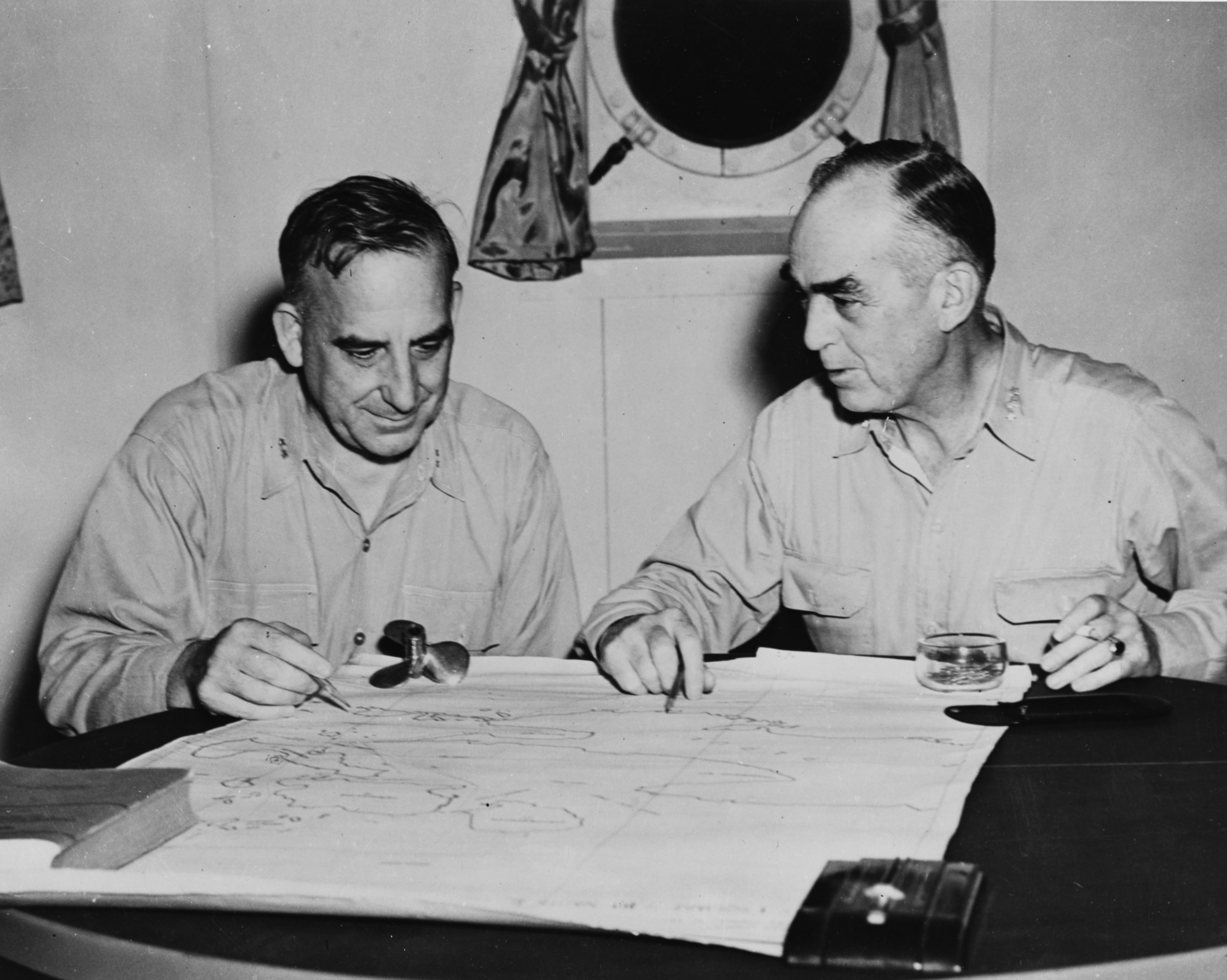
Barbey (left) with Vice Admiral Thomas C. Kinkaid during staff meeting.

Promoted to vice admiral on 9 December 1944, Barbey directed 30 more assaults in 1945, mostly in the southern Philippines and Borneo. He conducted the last amphibious operation of the war, the landings at Balikpapan, Borneo on 1 July 1945. In all, "Uncle Dan", as he was known, planned and conducted 56 amphibious operations, landing more than one million Australian and American soldiers and marines. For his wartime service in the Southwest Pacific, the U.S. Army awarded Barbey the Army Distinguished Service Medal. On Australia Day in 1948 the Australian government honored him with an honorary Commander of the Order of the British Empire, which was presented at the Australian embassy in Washington by Norman Makin, the Australian Ambassador to the United States.

== Post-war ==
After the war, Barbey replaced Kinkaid as commander of the Seventh Fleet. He continued the task of landing occupation forces in South Korea and North China. While providing training, transportation and support to the Chinese Nationalist Party forces, he attempted to prevent his own forces from becoming embroiled in the Chinese Civil War, which was engulfing North China. In March 1946 he became Commander Amphibious Force, Atlantic Fleet. In September he became commander of the Fourth Fleet. He briefly returned to the Far East in February 1947 as Chairman of the Joint Military Board on fact-finding mission to evaluate strategic requirements there. He returned to the U.S. in March to become Commandant of the 10th Naval District and commander of the Caribbean Sea Frontier from 1 May 1947 until 10 October 1950. His final assignment was as Commandant of the 13th Naval District. He retired as a vice admiral on 30 June 1951.

== Retirement and last years ==
In retirement, Barbey published his memoirs of his wartime service as MacArthur's Amphibious Navy in 1969. He died at the Naval Hospital in Bremerton, Washington on 11 March 1969. His papers are in the Naval Historical Center at the Washington Navy Yard in Washington, D.C. The Navy named a Knox-class frigate, USS Barbey (FF-1088) in his honor, which was launched at the Avondale Shipyards in Westwego, Louisiana by his widow on 4 December 1971.

== Decorations ==
Vice Admiral Daniel E. Barbey's ribbon bar:

1st Row	Navy Cross	Navy Distinguished Service Medal w/ Gold Star	Army Distinguished Service Medal
2nd Row	Legion of Merit	Nicaraguan Campaign Medal	Mexican Service Medal
3rd Row	World War I Victory Medal w/ Overseas Clasp	American Defense Service Medal w/ Atlantic Clasp	American Campaign Medal
4th Row	Asiatic–Pacific Campaign Medal w/ four service stars	World War II Victory Medal	National Defense Service Medal
5th Row	China Service Medal	Philippine Liberation Medal w/ two stars	Commander of the Order of the British Empire
6th Row	Grand Cordon of the Order of the Cloud and Banner	Order of Merit of Duarte, Sánchez and Mella	Order of Christopher Columbus
