= John Hutchins =

John Hutchins may refer to:

- John Hutchins (politician), member of the U.S. House of Representatives from Ohio
- John Hutchins (antiquary), Church of England clergyman and topographer
- John Hutchings (Virginia politician) (1691-1768), member of the Virginia House of Burgesses and mayor of Mayor of Norfolk, Virginia
- W. John Hutchins, English linguist and information scientist
- J. Weston Hutchins, member of the Michigan Senate

== See also ==
- Johnnie David Hutchins, United States Navy sailor and Medal of Honor recipient
  - USS Johnnie Hutchins
