= USS LST-475 =

1942 LST-1-class tank landing ship

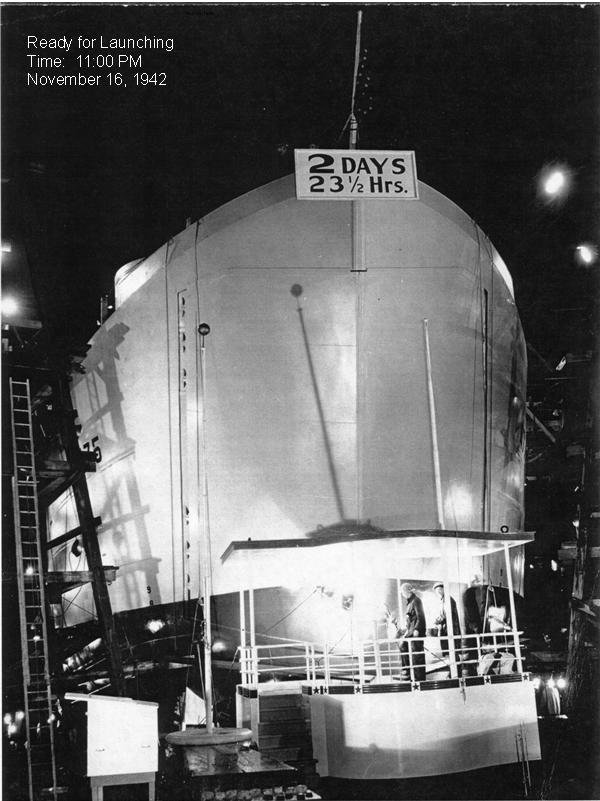
- USS LST-475 while under construction at Kaiser, Inc., Vancouver, WA. She was built in record time, 71 hours and 50 minutes from keel laying to launching, 16 November 1942.

History

United States
- Name: LST-475
- Ordered: as a Type S3-M-K2 hull, MCE hull 995
- Builder: Kaiser Shipbuilding Company, Vancouver, Washington
- Yard number: 179
- Laid down: 14 November 1942
- Launched: 16 November 1942
- Commissioned: 20 March 1943
- Decommissioned: 24 April 1946
- Stricken: 5 June 1946
- Identification: Hull symbol: LST-475; Code letters: NPNN
- Honors and awards: 6 × battle stars
- Fate: Sold, 31 October 1946

General characteristics
- Class & type: LST-1-class tank landing ship
- Displacement: 4,080 long tons (4,145 t) full load; 2,160 long tons (2,190 t) landing
- Length: 328 ft (100 m) oa
- Beam: 50 ft (15 m)
- Draft: Full load: 8 ft 2 in (2.49 m) forward; 14 ft 1 in (4.29 m) aft; Landing at 2,160 t: 3 ft 11 in (1.19 m) forward; 9 ft 10 in (3.00 m) aft
- Installed power: 2 × 900 hp (670 kW) Electro-Motive Diesel 12-567A diesel engines; 1,700 shp (1,300 kW)
- Propulsion: 1 × Falk main reduction gears; 2 × Propellers
- Speed: 12 kn (22 km/h; 14 mph)
- Range: 24,000 nmi (44,000 km; 28,000 mi) at 9 kn (17 km/h; 10 mph) while displacing 3,960 long tons (4,024 t)
- Boats & landing craft carried: 2 or 6 x LCVPs
- Capacity: 2,100 tons oceangoing maximum; 350 tons main deckload
- Troops: 16 officers, 147 enlisted men
- Complement: 13 officers, 104 enlisted men
- Armament: Varied, ultimate armament; 2 × twin 40 mm (1.57 in) Bofors guns; 4 × single 40 mm Bofors guns; 12 × 20 mm (0.79 in) Oerlikon cannons

Service record
- Part of: LST Flotilla 7
- Operations: Eastern New Guinea operations; Lae occupation (4–6, 9–11 September 1943); Saidor occupation (2–11 January 1944); Bismarck Archipelago operations; Cape Gloucester, New Britain (26–29 December 1943, 22–25 January, 30 January–2 February 1944); Hollandia operation (21–26 April 1944); Western New Guinea operations; Noemfoor Island operation (11–18 July 1944); Cape Sansapor operation (31 July, 6, 8–14, 16–22 August 1944); Morotai landing (15 September 1944); Leyte landings (13–27 October, 5–18 November 1944); Lingayen Gulf landings (4–15 January 1945); Borneo operations; Balikpapan operation (June–July 1945)
- Awards: American Campaign Medal; Asiatic–Pacific Campaign Medal; World War II Victory Medal; Navy Occupation Service Medal w/Asia Clasp; Philippine Republic Presidential Unit Citation; Philippine Liberation Medal

USS LST-475 was a United States Navy LST-1-class tank landing ship used in the Asiatic-Pacific Theater during World War II. As with many of her class, the ship was never named. Instead, she was referred to by her hull designation.

== Construction ==
The ship was laid down on 14 November 1942, under Maritime Commission (MARCOM) contract, MC hull 995, by Kaiser Shipyards, Vancouver, Washington; launched 16 November 1942; and commissioned on 20 March 1943.

== Service history ==
During the war, LST-475 was assigned to the Pacific Theater of Operations. She took part in the Eastern New Guinea operations, the Lae occupation in September 1943, and the Saidor occupation in January 1944; the Bismarck Archipelago operations, the Cape Gloucester, New Britain landings in December 1943; Hollandia operation in April 1944; the Western New Guinea operations, the Noemfoor Island operation in July 1944, the Cape Sansapor operation in July and August 1944, and the Morotai landing in September 1944; the Leyte operation in October and November 1944; the Lingayen Gulf landings in January 1945; and the Borneo operation, the Balikpapan operation in June and July 1945.

Following the war, LST-475 performed occupation duty in the Far East until mid-October 1945. Upon her return to the United States, the ship was decommissioned on 24 April 1946, and struck from the Navy list on 5 June, that same year. On 31 October 1946, she was sold to the Suwannee Fruit & Steamship Co., Jacksonville, Florida.

== Honors and awards ==
LST-475 earned six battle stars for her World War II service.

== Notes ==
Citations

== Bibliography ==
Online resources

- "LST-475". Dictionary of American Naval Fighting Ships. Naval History and Heritage Command. This article incorporates text from this source, which is in the public domain.
- "Kaiser Vancouver, Vancouver WA". www.ShipbuildingHistory.com. 27 November 2010.
- "USS LST-475". NavSource. 31 October 2014.
