= USS LST-463 =

1942 LST-1-class tank landing ship

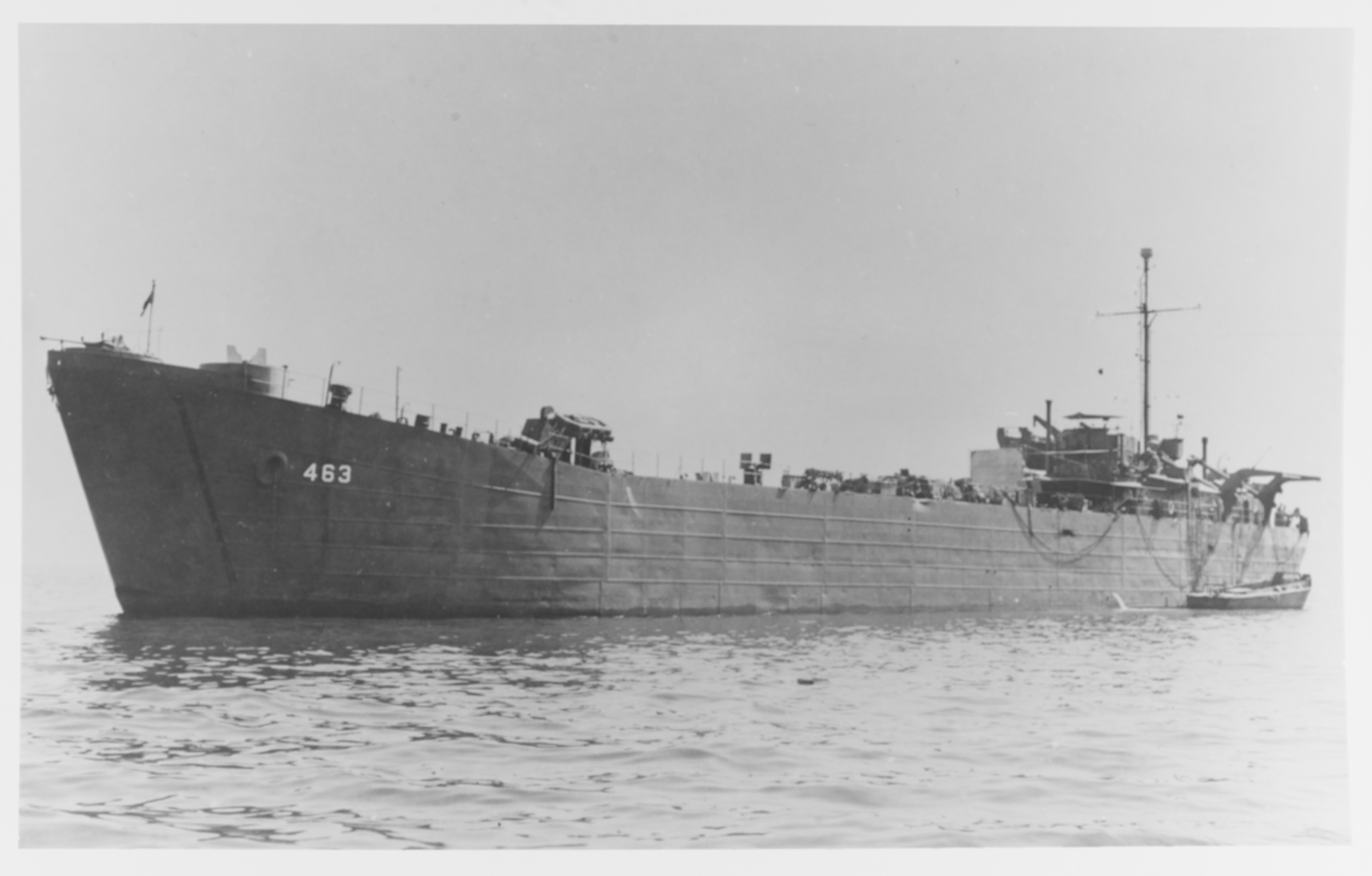
- USS LST-463 c. 1945.

History

United States
- Name: LST-463
- Ordered: as a Type S3-M-K2 hull, MCE hull 983
- Builder: Kaiser Shipbuilding Company, Vancouver, Washington
- Yard number: 167
- Laid down: 6 October 1942
- Launched: 9 November 1942
- Commissioned: 23 February 1943
- Decommissioned: 6 June 1946
- Stricken: 19 June 1946
- Identification: Hull symbol: LST-463; Code letters: NFPM
- Honors and awards: 9 × battle stars
- Fate: Sold for commercial service, 3 November 1947

General characteristics
- Class & type: LST-1-class tank landing ship
- Displacement: 4,080 long tons (4,145 t) full load; 2,160 long tons (2,190 t) landing
- Length: 328 ft (100 m) oa
- Beam: 50 ft (15 m)
- Draft: Full load: 8 ft 2 in (2.49 m) forward; 14 ft 1 in (4.29 m) aft; Landing at 2,160 t: 3 ft 11 in (1.19 m) forward; 9 ft 10 in (3.00 m) aft
- Installed power: 2 × 900 hp (670 kW) Electro-Motive Diesel 12-567A diesel engines; 1,700 shp (1,300 kW)
- Propulsion: 1 × Falk main reduction gears; 2 × Propellers
- Speed: 12 kn (22 km/h; 14 mph)
- Range: 24,000 nmi (44,000 km; 28,000 mi) at 9 kn (17 km/h; 10 mph) while displacing 3,960 long tons (4,024 t)
- Boats & landing craft carried: 2 or 6 x LCVPs
- Capacity: 2,100 tons oceangoing maximum; 350 tons main deckload
- Troops: 16 officers, 147 enlisted men
- Complement: 13 officers, 104 enlisted men
- Armament: Varied, ultimate armament; 2 × twin 40 mm (1.57 in) Bofors guns; 4 × single 40 mm Bofors guns; 12 × 20 mm (0.79 in) Oerlikon cannons

Service record
- Operations: Bismarck Archipelago operation; Cape Gloucester, New Britain (28–31 December 1943, 3–7, 11–14, 23–25 January, 7–10, 18–21 February and 25 February–1 March 1944); Eastern New Guinea operation; Saidor occupation (15–17, 19–22, 28–30 January and 12–14 February 1944); Hollandia operation (21–25 April 1944); Western New Guinea operation; Biak Islands operation (27–29 May, 31 May–4 June, 12–16, 18–20 June 1944); Noemfoor Island operation (3–10, 12–17 July 1944); Cape Sansapor operation (30 July and 4, 6–12, 14–20, 22–28 August 1944); Morotai landing (15 September 1944); Leyte landings (13–28 October, 5–18 November 1944); Lingayen Gulf landings (4–15 January 1945); Zambales-Subic Bay (29–30 January 1945); Mindanao Island landings (17–23 April 1945); Assault and occupation of Okinawa Gunto (12–30 June 1945)
- Awards: Combat Action Ribbon; American Campaign Medal; Asiatic–Pacific Campaign Medal; World War II Victory Medal; Philippine Republic Presidential Unit Citation; Philippine Liberation Medal

USS LST-463 was a United States Navy LST-1-class tank landing ship used in the Asiatic-Pacific Theater during World War II. As with many of her class, the ship was never named. Instead, she was referred to by her hull designation.

== Construction ==
The ship was laid down on 6 October 1942, under Maritime Commission (MARCOM) contract, MC hull 983, by Kaiser Shipyards, Vancouver, Washington; launched 9 November 1942; and commissioned on 23 February 1943.

== Service history ==
During World War II, LST-463 was assigned to the Asiatic-Pacific theater. She took part in the Bismarck Archipelago operation, the Cape Gloucester, New Britain, landings from December 1943 through March 1944; the Eastern New Guinea operation, the Saidor occupation in January and February 1944; Hollandia operation in April 1944; the Western New Guinea operations, the Biak Islands operation in May and June 1944, the Noemfoor Island operation in July 1944, the Cape Sansapor operation in July and August 1944, and the Morotai landing in September 1944; the Leyte operation in October and November 1944; the Lingayen Gulf landings in January 1945; the Zambales-Subic Bay operation in January 1945, the Mindanao Island landings in April 1945, and the assault and occupation of Okinawa Gunto in June 1945.

Following the war, LST-463 returned to the United States and was decommissioned on 6 June 1946, and struck from the Navy list on 19 June, that same year. On 3 November 1947, the tank landing ship was sold to Dulien Steel Products, Inc., of Seattle, Washington.

== Honors and awards ==
LST-463 earned nine battle stars for her World War II service.

== Notes ==
Citations

== Bibliography ==
Online resources

- "LST-463". Dictionary of American Naval Fighting Ships. Naval History and Heritage Command. 3 August 2015. This article incorporates text from this source, which is in the public domain.
- "Kaiser Vancouver, Vancouver WA". www.ShipbuildingHistory.com. 27 November 2010.
- "USS LST-463". NavSource. 10 October 2014.
