= USS LST-458 =

1942 LST-1-class tank landing ship

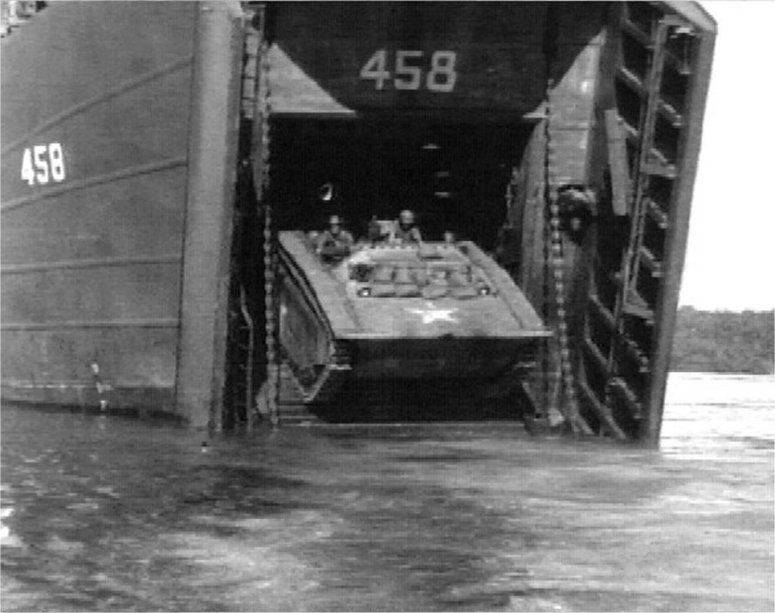
- USS LST-458, at Morotai Island, Dutch East Indies, 15 September 1944, off loading an LVT.

History

United States
- Name: LST-458
- Ordered: as a Type S3-M-K2 hull, MCE hull 978
- Builder: Kaiser Shipbuilding Company, Vancouver, Washington
- Yard number: 162
- Laid down: 18 September 1942
- Launched: 26 October 1942
- Commissioned: 10 February 1943
- Decommissioned: 15 April 1946
- Stricken: 3 July 1946
- Identification: Hull symbol: LST-458; Code letters: NFKC
- Honors and awards: 6 × battle stars
- Fate: Transferred to MARCOM, 31 October 1947; Sold for scrapping, 31 October 1947

General characteristics
- Class & type: LST-1-class tank landing ship
- Displacement: 4,080 long tons (4,145 t) full load; 2,160 long tons (2,190 t) landing
- Length: 328 ft (100 m) oa
- Beam: 50 ft (15 m)
- Draft: Full load: 8 ft 2 in (2.49 m) forward; 14 ft 1 in (4.29 m) aft; Landing at 2,160 t: 3 ft 11 in (1.19 m) forward; 9 ft 10 in (3.00 m) aft
- Installed power: 2 × 900 hp (670 kW) Electro-Motive Diesel 12-567A diesel engines; 1,700 shp (1,300 kW)
- Propulsion: 1 × Falk main reduction gears; 2 × Propellers
- Speed: 12 kn (22 km/h; 14 mph)
- Range: 24,000 nmi (44,000 km; 28,000 mi) at 9 kn (17 km/h; 10 mph) while displacing 3,960 long tons (4,024 t)
- Boats & landing craft carried: 2 or 6 x LCVPs
- Capacity: 2,100 tons oceangoing maximum; 350 tons main deckload
- Troops: 16 officers, 147 enlisted men
- Complement: 13 officers, 104 enlisted men
- Armament: Varied, ultimate armament; 2 × twin 40 mm (1.57 in) Bofors guns; 4 × single 40 mm Bofors guns; 12 × 20 mm (0.79 in) Oerlikon cannons

Service record
- Operations: Eastern New Guinea operation; Lae occupation (4–5, 9–11 September 1943); Saidor occupation (January and 12–14 February 1944); Bismarck Archipelago operation; Cape Gloucester, New Britain (25–28 December 1943, 21–23 January and 18–21, 23–26 February 1944); Admiralty Islands landings (7–11 and 14–18 March 1944); Hollandia operation (21–25 April 1944); Western New Guinea operation; Toem-Wakde-Sarmi area operation (17–18 and 23–25 May 1944); Biak Islands operation (6–10 and 14–20 June 1944); Cape Sansapor operation (12–18 and 20–26 August 1944); Morotai landing (15 September 1944); Leyte landings (13–28 October and 2–18 November 1944); Visayan Island landings (26 March, 2, 10–11 and 20 April 1945); Mindanao Island landings (17–23 April 1945)
- Awards: Navy Unit Commendation; American Campaign Medal; Asiatic–Pacific Campaign Medal; World War II Victory Medal; Navy Occupation Service Medal w/Asia Clasp; Philippine Republic Presidential Unit Citation; Philippine Liberation Medal

USS LST-458 was a United States Navy LST-1-class tank landing ship used in the Asiatic-Pacific Theater during World War II.

== Construction ==
LST-458 was laid down on 18 September 1942, under Maritime Commission (MARCOM) contract, MC hull 978, by Kaiser Shipyards, Vancouver, Washington; launched on 26 October 1942; and commissioned on 10 February 1943.

== Service history ==
During the war, LST-458 was assigned to the Pacific Theater of Operations. She took part in the Eastern New Guinea operations, the Lae occupation in September 1943, and the Saidor occupation in February 1944; the Bismarck Archipelago operations, the Cape Gloucester, New Britain, landings from December 1943 through February 1944, and the Admiralty Islands landings in March 1944; the Hollandia operation in April 1944; the Western New Guinea operations, the Toem-Wakde-Sarmi area operation in May 1944, the Biak Islands operation in June 1944, the Noemfoor Island operation in July 1944, the Cape Sansapor operation in August 1944, and the Morotai landing in September 1944; the Leyte landings in October and November 1944; and the Mindanao Island landings in April 1945.

== Post-war service ==
Following the war, LST-458 performed occupation duty in the Far East until mid-October 1945. Upon her return to the United States, she was decommissioned on 15 April 1946, and struck from the Navy list on 3 July 1946. On 31 October 1947, the ship was sold to the Luria Steel & Trading Corp., of Philadelphia, Pennsylvania, and subsequently scrapped.

== Honors and awards ==
LST-458 earned six battle stars for her World War II service.

== Notes ==
Citations

== Bibliography ==
Online resources

- "LST-458". Dictionary of American Naval Fighting Ships. Naval History and Heritage Command. This article incorporates text from this source, which is in the public domain.
- "Kaiser Vancouver, Vancouver WA". www.ShipbuildingHistory.com. 27 November 2010.
- "USS LST-458". NavSource. 10 October 2014.
