= USS LST-452 =

1942 LST-1-class tank landing ship

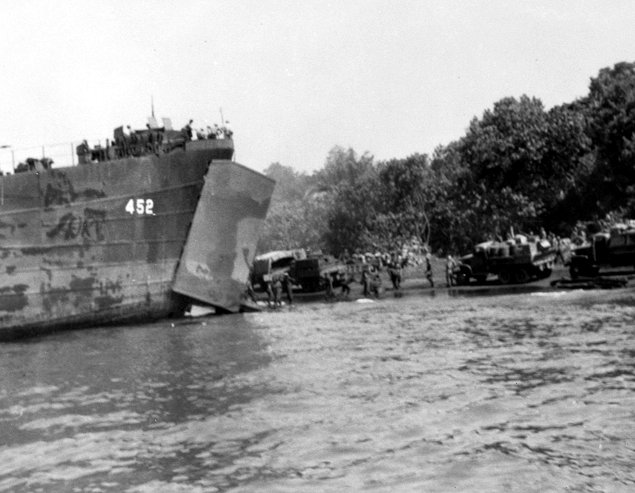
- USS LST-452, and other LSTs are unloading troops and equipment of part of the 9th Australian Division, under the command of Major-General G.F. Wooten landing at Lae, New Guinea, 4 September 1943.

History

United States
- Name: LST-452
- Ordered: as a Type S3-M-K2 hull, MCE hull 972
- Builder: Kaiser Shipbuilding Company, Vancouver, Washington
- Yard number: 156
- Laid down: 20 July 1942
- Launched: 10 October 1942
- Commissioned: 16 January 1943
- Decommissioned: 12 June 1946
- Identification: Hull symbol: LST-452; Code letters: NFEW
- Honors and awards: 7 × battle stars
- Fate: Sold, 5 December 1947

General characteristics
- Class & type: LST-1-class tank landing ship
- Displacement: 4,080 long tons (4,145 t) full load; 2,160 long tons (2,190 t) landing
- Length: 328 ft (100 m) oa
- Beam: 50 ft (15 m)
- Draft: Full load: 8 ft 2 in (2.49 m) forward; 14 ft 1 in (4.29 m) aft; Landing at 2,160 t: 3 ft 11 in (1.19 m) forward; 9 ft 10 in (3.00 m) aft
- Installed power: 2 × 900 hp (670 kW) Electro-Motive Diesel 12-567A diesel engines; 1,700 shp (1,300 kW)
- Propulsion: 1 × Falk main reduction gears; 2 × Propellers
- Speed: 12 kn (22 km/h; 14 mph)
- Range: 24,000 nmi (44,000 km; 28,000 mi) at 9 kn (17 km/h; 10 mph) while displacing 3,960 long tons (4,024 t)
- Boats & landing craft carried: 2 or 6 x LCVPs
- Capacity: 2,100 tons oceangoing maximum; 350 tons main deckload
- Troops: 16 officers, 147 enlisted men
- Complement: 13 officers, 104 enlisted men
- Armament: Varied, ultimate armament; 2 × twin 40 mm (1.57 in) Bofors guns; 4 × single 40 mm Bofors guns; 12 × 20 mm (0.79 in) Oerlikon cannons

Service record
- Operations: Eastern New Guinea operation; Lae occupation (September 1943); Finschhafen occupation (September 1943); Saidor occupation (January 1944); Bismarck Archipelago operation; Cape Gloucester, New Britain (December 1943–February 1944); Admiralty Islands landings (March 1944); Hollandia operation (April–May 1944); Western New Guinea operation; Biak Islands operation (May–June 1944); Cape Sansapor operation (July–August 1944); Morotai landing (September 1944); Leyte landings (October 1944); Lingayen Gulf landings (January 1945); Balikpapan operation (June–July 1945)
- Awards: Navy Unit Commendation; China Service Medal; American Campaign Medal; Asiatic–Pacific Campaign Medal; World War II Victory Medal

USS LST-452 was a United States Navy LST-1-class tank landing ship used in the Asiatic-Pacific Theater during World War II.

== Construction ==
LST-452 was laid down on 20 July 1942, under Maritime Commission (MARCOM) contract, MC hull 972, by Kaiser Shipyards, Vancouver, Washington; launched on 10 October 1942; and commissioned on 16 January 1943.

== Service history ==
During the war, LST-452 was assigned to the Pacific Theater of Operations. She took part in the Eastern New Guinea operations, the Lae occupation in September 1943, the Finschhafen occupation in September 1943, and the Saidor occupation in January 1944; the Bismarck Archipelago operations, the Cape Gloucester, New Britain, landings from December 1943 through February 1944, and the Admiralty Islands landings in March 1944; the Hollandia operation in April and May 1944; the Western New Guinea operations, the Biak Islands operation in May and June 1944, the Cape Sansapor operation in July and August 1944, and the Morotai landing in September 1944; the Leyte landings in October 1944; the Lingayen Gulf landings in January 1945; and the Balikpapan operation in June and July 1945.

== Post-war service ==
Following the war, LST-452 saw service in China until mid-May 1946. She returned to the United States and was decommissioned on 12 June 1946, and struck from the Navy list on 3 July, that same year. On 5 December 1947, the ship was sold to Bosey, Philippines.

== Honors and awards ==
LST-452 earned seven battle stars and the Navy Unit Commendation for her gallant World War II service.

== Notes ==
Citations

== Bibliography ==
Online resources

- "LST-452". Dictionary of American Naval Fighting Ships. Naval History and Heritage Command. This article incorporates text from this source, which is in the public domain.
- "Kaiser Vancouver, Vancouver WA". www.ShipbuildingHistory.com. 27 November 2010.
- "USS LST-452". NavSource. 10 March 2017.
