= USS Johnnie Hutchins =

History

United States
- Name: Johnnie Hutchins
- Namesake: Johnnie David Hutchins
- Builder: Consolidated Steel Corporation, Orange, Texas
- Laid down: 6 March 1944
- Launched: 2 May 1944
- Commissioned: 28 August 1944
- Decommissioned: 14 May 1946
- Commissioned: 23 June 1950
- Decommissioned: 25 February 1958
- In service: 23 June 1950 (Naval reserve)
- Stricken: 1 July 1972
- Identification: DE-360
- Fate: Sold for scrapping 5 February 1974

General characteristics
- Class & type: John C. Butler-class destroyer escort
- Displacement: 1,350 long tons (1,372 t)
- Length: 306 ft (93 m)
- Beam: 36 ft 8 in (11.18 m)
- Draft: 9 ft 5 in (2.87 m)
- Propulsion: 2 boilers, 2 geared turbine engines, 12,000 shp (8,900 kW); 2 propellers
- Speed: 24 knots (44 km/h; 28 mph)
- Range: 6,000 nmi (11,000 km; 6,900 mi) at 12 kn (22 km/h; 14 mph)
- Complement: 14 officers, 201 enlisted
- Armament: 2 × single 5 in (127 mm) guns; 2 × twin 40 mm (1.6 in) AA guns; 10 × single 20 mm (0.79 in) AA guns; 1 × triple 21 in (533 mm) torpedo tubes; 8 × depth charge throwers; 1 × Hedgehog ASW mortar; 2 × depth charge racks

USS Johnnie Hutchins (DE-360) was a John C. Butler-class destroyer escort acquired by the U.S. Navy during World War II. The primary purpose of the destroyer escort was to escort and protect ships in convoy, in addition to other tasks as assigned, such as patrol or radar picket. She served in the Pacific Ocean, and, post-war, she returned home with a Navy Unit Commendation awarded to her for her battle with Japanese midget submarines on 9 August 1945.

USS Johnnie Hutchins was named in honor of Johnnie David Hutchins who was awarded the United States' highest award, the Medal of Honor, for giving his own life in order to save his shipmates on 4 September 1943 aboard USS LST-473 during the assault on Lae, New Guinea. The destroyer escort's keel was laid down 6 March 1944 by Consolidated Steel Corp., Ltd. at their yard in Orange, Texas. The ship was launched on 2 May 1944, sponsored by Mrs. Johnnie M. Hutchins, mother of Seaman First Class Hutchins and commissioned on 28 August 1944.

== Operational history ==
=== Initial operations and transfer to Pacific ===
The new escort vessel sailed for shakedown training out of Bermuda 11 September 1944, and 5 days later encountered the survivors of destroyer Warrington, sunk in a hurricane off the U.S. East Coast. Johnnie Hutchins rescued 34 officers and men and, after transporting them to Norfolk, Virginia, continued to Bermuda. The ship completed exhaustive shakedown exercises and arrived Boston, Massachusetts, 25 October 1944 for brief coastal convoy duties between that port and Norfolk.

Johnnie Hutchins got underway for the Pacific Ocean 30 November from Norfolk, steaming by way of the Panama Canal, Bora Bora, and Manus, and arriving Hollandia 21 January 1945. Five days later she steamed from Humboldt Bay to Leyte on her first Pacific escort assignment, arriving Leyte Gulf 31 January. During the months that followed the ship acted as an escort for resupply and reinforcement convoys from advance bases to Lingayen and Leyte.

=== Pacific operations ===
The destroyer escort arrived Subic Bay, Philippines on 22 May 1945 to join a hunter-killer group. In June and July she trained with American and British submarines and carried out antisubmarine searches in preparation for the eventual invasion of Japan.

While operating with a task group in the shipping lanes between Luzon and Okinawa 9 August 1945, Johnnie Hutchins encountered a surfaced midget submarine, and was taken under fire. As the ship's accurate gunnery succeeded in sinking the Japanese sub, another fired a torpedo at her. The torpedo was avoided and with a well-placed series of depth charges, sank the second submarine. A third was probably damaged by depth charges the same day.

=== Postwar assignments ===
After the end of the war against Japan, Johnnie Hutchins spent 2 months escorting ships through swept channels and acting as air-sea rescue ship off Okinawa. She also steamed off Japan and Korea during the occupation. In early October the ship arrived at Shanghai for duty with the U.S. Marines attempting to stabilize the turbulent Chinese situation. The destroyer escort escorted vessels to and from various occupied ports until 22 November 1945 when she weighed anchor in the Yangtze River and headed eastward to Pearl Harbor. Johnnie Hutchins arrived at San Pedro, Los Angeles on 15 December 1945.

Following decommissioning at San Diego, California on 14 May 1946, Johnnie Hutchins made two-month-long Naval Reserve training cruises to the Hawaiian Islands, one in the summer of 1948 and one in 1949. In early 1950 the ship steamed through the Panama Canal to Boston, where she was assigned permanent duty as Naval Reserve Training Ship for the 1st Naval District. Johnnie Hutchins was placed in commission "in reserve" 23 June 1950, and in commission 22 November 1950. With a skeleton crew supplemented by Naval Reservists, the destroyer escort made regular training cruises during the next few years, visiting Montreal, Quebec, and many Caribbean ports. With a task group of other training ships she made a voyage to Europe in June–July 1955.

=== Final decommissioning ===
Johnnie Hutchins continued as a training ship until decommissioning on 25 February 1958 at Bayonne, New Jersey. The ship entered the Atlantic Reserve Fleet and was berthed at Philadelphia, Pennsylvania. She was struck from the Navy list on 1 July 1972, and, on 5 February 1974, she was sold to be broken up for scrap.

== Awards ==
Johnnie Hutchins received the Navy Unit Commendation for her battle with midget submarines 9 August 1945.

== See also ==
- USS Hutchins (DD-476) has a similar name.
