= Cape Opmarai Airfield =

Disused airfield in Indonesia

- Southwest Papua, Indonesia
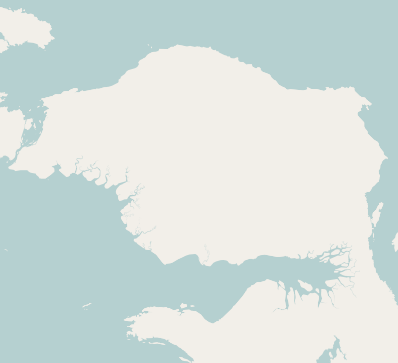
- Location in Southwest Papua Location in Bird's Head Peninsula

Site information
- Type: Military Airfield

Location
- Coordinates: 00°28′14″S 132°07′20″E

Site history
- Built by: United States

Cape Opmarai Airfield is a disused airfield located near Sansapor, in Southwest Papua, Indonesia. It is abandoned and overgrown, disused since 1944.

== History ==
The airfield was used during the Sansapor-Cape Opmarai Operation, 30 July-31 August 1944 in northern Dutch New Guinea. On 30 July, a task force comprising elements of the United States Army 6th Division made simultaneous and unopposed landings near Cape Opmarai on the mainland, and on Middelburg and Amsterdam Islands to the northwest. Only a few enemy stragglers were encountered. The next day a shore-to shore landing from Cape Opmarai was carried out at Sansapor.

As in other New Guinea areas, airdrome construction proceeded rapidly. In a short time airfields at Cape Opmarai and on Middelburg Island and a float plane base at Amsterdam Island were fully operative. The airfield was used as a tactical fighter strip, then abandoned after MacArthur moved into the Dutch East Indies on his drive to the Philippines.
