= USS LCI(L)-339 =

History

United States
- Name: USS LCI(L)-339
- Builder: Brown Shipbuilding Company; Houston, Texas
- Commissioned: 30 December 1942
- Stricken: Unknown
- Fate: Lost in action on Red Beach during landing at Lae

General characteristics
- Class & type: LCI(L)-351-class large landing craft
- Displacement: 216 t.(light), 234 t.(landing), 389 t.(loaded)
- Length: 158 ft 5.5 in (48.298 m)
- Beam: 23 ft 3 in (7.09 m)
- Draft: Light, 3 ft 1.5 in (0.953 m) mean; Landing, 2 ft 8 in (0.81 m) fwd, 4 ft 10 in (1.47 m) aft; Loaded, 5 ft 4 in (1.63 m) fwd, 5 ft 11 in (1.80 m) aft
- Propulsion: 2 sets of 4 General Motors diesels, 4 per shaft, BHP 1,600, twin variable pitch propellers
- Speed: 16 knots (30 km/h) (max.); 14 knots (26 km/h) maximum continuous
- Endurance: 4,000 miles at 12 knots, loaded, 500 miles at 15 knots; and 110 tons of fuel
- Capacity: 75 tons cargo
- Troops: 6 Officers, 182 Enlisted
- Complement: 3 officers, 21 enlisted
- Armament: 4 × 20 mm AA guns; 2 × .50" machine guns
- Armor: 2" plastic splinter protection on gun turrets, conning tower, and pilot house

USS LCI(L)-339 was an amphibious assault ship (Landing Craft Infantry – Large), commissioned in 1942 by the United States Coast Guard. She participated in the Australian Army's 9th Division's landing at Lae on 4 September 1943, where she was abandoned after being hit during a Japanese air attack. The bomb exploded on the deck forward of the bridge, killing Lieutenant Colonel R. E. Wall, the commander of the 2/23rd Battalion and 6 others, and wounding 28. Her hulk was beached, until sometime later, when her hull was towed off the beach and cast adrift, becoming a wreck on a nearby reef.
