= Johnnie David Hutchins =

Decorated United States Navy sailor (1922–1943)

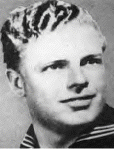
- Born: August 4, 1922; Weimar, Texas, US
- Died: September 4, 1943 (aged 21); Killed in Action off the coast of Lae, New Guinea
- Burial place: Lakeside Cemetery, Eagle Lake, Texas
- Military career
- Allegiance: United States of America
- Branch: United States Naval Reserve
- Service years: 1942 - 1943
- Rank: Seaman First Class
- Unit: USS LST 473
- Conflicts: World War II; *Salamaua-Lae campaign
- Awards: American Campaign Medal; Asiatic Pacific Campaign Medal; Combat Action Ribbon; World War II Victory Medal; Medal of Honor; Purple Heart

Johnnie David Hutchins (August 4, 1922 – September 4, 1943) was a United States Navy sailor and a recipient of the United States military's highest decoration—the Medal of Honor—for his actions in World War II. He enlisted in the Navy from Houston in November 1942.

Hutchins, aged 21 at his death, was buried in Lakeside Cemetery, Eagle Lake, Texas.

== Medal of Honor citation ==
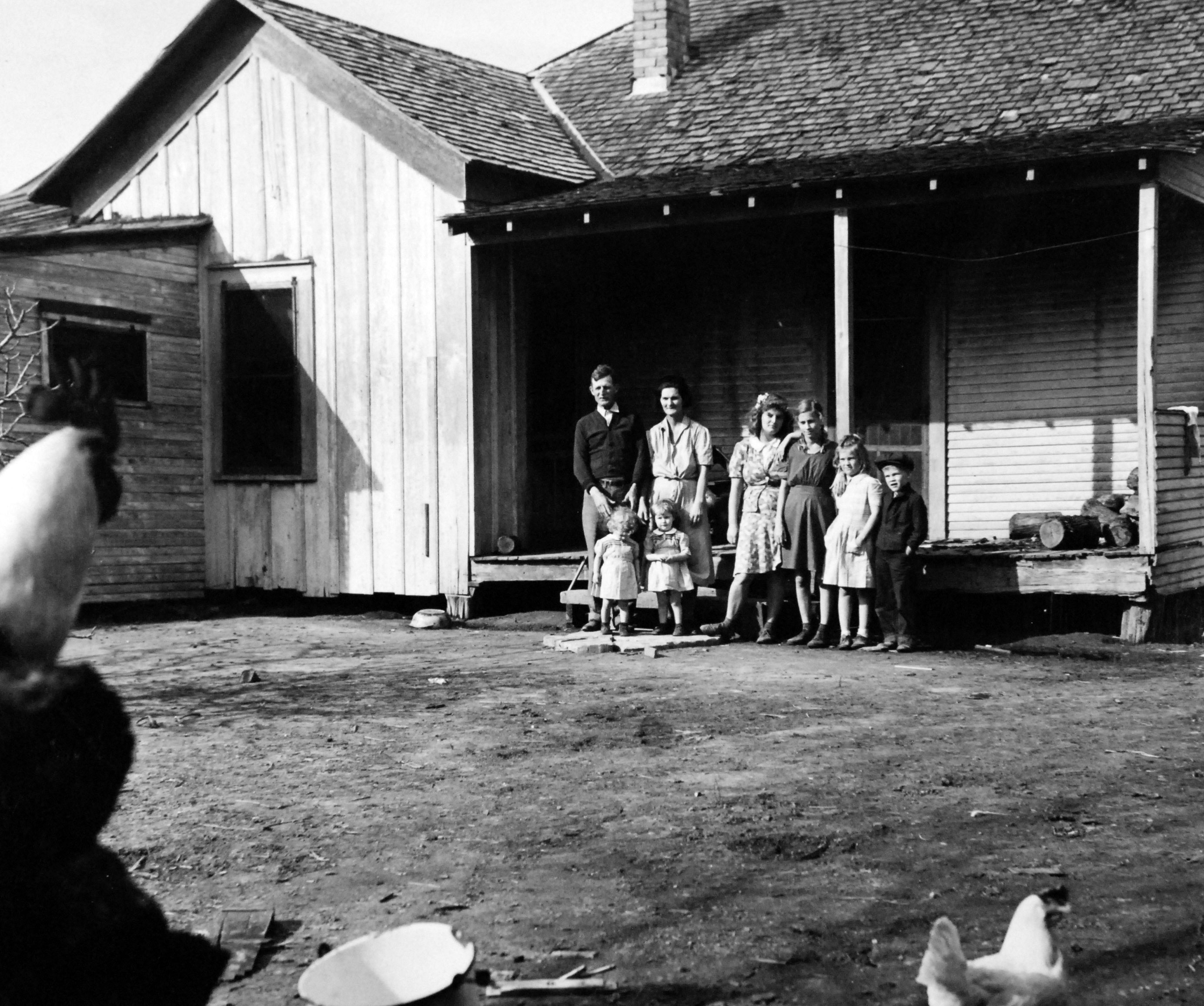
The family of Johnnie D. Hutchins stands in front of the Hutchins cottage in Lissie, Texas, after he was posthumously awarded the Medal of Honor (April 1944).

Seaman First Class Hutchins' official Medal of Honor citation reads:

For extraordinary heroism and conspicuous valor above and beyond the call of duty while serving on board a Landing Ship, Tank, during the assault on Lae, New Guinea, 4 September 1943. As the ship on which Hutchins was stationed approached the enemy-occupied beach under a veritable hail of fire from Japanese shore batteries and aerial bombardment, a hostile torpedo pierced the surf and bore down upon the vessel with deadly accuracy. In the tense split seconds before the helmsman could steer clear of the threatening missile, a bomb struck the pilot house, dislodged him from his station, and left the stricken ship helplessly exposed. Fully aware of the dire peril of the situation, Hutchins, although mortally wounded by the shattering explosion, quickly grasped the wheel and exhausted the last of his strength in maneuvering the vessel clear of the advancing torpedo. Still clinging to the helm, he eventually succumbed to his injuries, his final thoughts concerned only with the safety of his ship, his final efforts expended toward the security of his mission. He gallantly gave his life in the service of his country.

Johnnie Hutchins was serving aboard USS LST 473 at the time of this action. Hutchins and seven other shipmates were killed in action and 14 others were seriously wounded.

== Awards and decorations ==

1st row	Medal of Honor	Purple Heart	Combat Action Ribbon
2nd row	American Campaign Medal	Asiatic-Pacific Campaign Medal with one campaign star	World War II Victory Medal

== Namesake ==
USS Johnnie Hutchins (DE-360) was named in his honor. The ship was laid down March 6, 1944 by Consolidated Steel Corp., Ltd., Orange, Texas; launched May 2, 1944; sponsored by Mrs. Johnnie M. Hutchins, mother of Seaman First Class Hutchins; and commissioned August 28, 1944, Comdr. H. M. Godsey in command.

== See also ==
- List of Medal of Honor recipients
