= Landing at Lae =

Amphibious landing of World War II

- Part of World War II, Pacific War
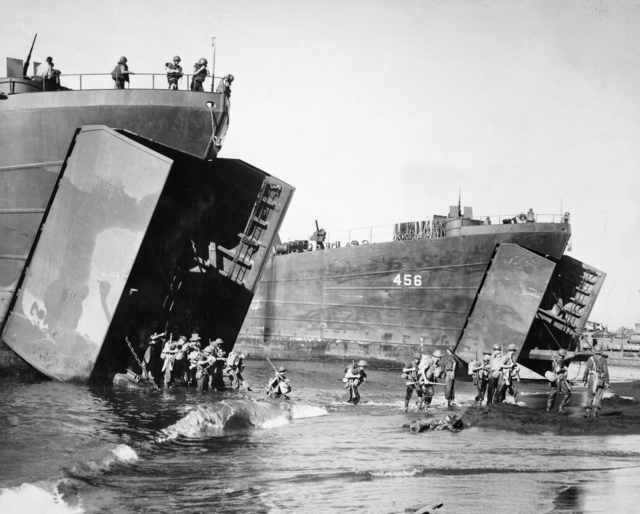
- Australian troops disembarking from American Landing Ships, Tank (LST), including LST-456, at Red Beach
| Date | 4–16 September 1943 |
| Location | Lae area, Morobe Province, Territory of New Guinea 06°44′00″S 147°00′00″E |
| Result | Allied victory |

Belligerents
| Australia; United States | Japan |

Commanders and leaders
| (Australia) George Wootten (United States) Daniel Barbey | (Empire of Japan) Hatazō Adachi (Empire of Japan) Ryoichi Shoge |

Units involved
| I Corps: 9th Division; VII Amphibious Force | XVIII Army: 51st Division; Shoge Detachment |

The Landing at Lae was an amphibious landing to the east of Lae and then the subsequent advance on the town during the Salamaua–Lae campaign of World War II. Part of Operation Postern, which was undertaken to capture the Japanese base at Lae, the landing was undertaken between 4 and 6 September 1943 by Australian troops from the 9th Division, supported by US naval forces from the VII Amphibious Force. The first major amphibious operation undertaken by the Australian Army since the failed Gallipoli Campaign, the Australians invested a significant amount of effort into planning the operation.

The initial landing saw one brigade and supporting elements being landed at two beaches about 27 kilometres (17 mi) east of Lae. Once this brigade had secured the beachhead, a second brigade was landed to follow them up and help expand the beachhead. In the days following the landing the division's third and final brigade was brought ashore. The landing was carried out in conjunction with the airborne landing at Nadzab, and was followed by a drive on Lae by the 7th Division from Nadzab and the 9th from the landing beaches, which advanced with two brigades while one held the landing beach. Hampered by bad weather, logistical difficulties, and stiff resistance by the Japanese defenders, the 9th Division's advance stalled and ultimately troops from the 7th Division entered Lae first, entering the town on 16 September, the day before the 9th.

== Strategy ==
=== Allied ===
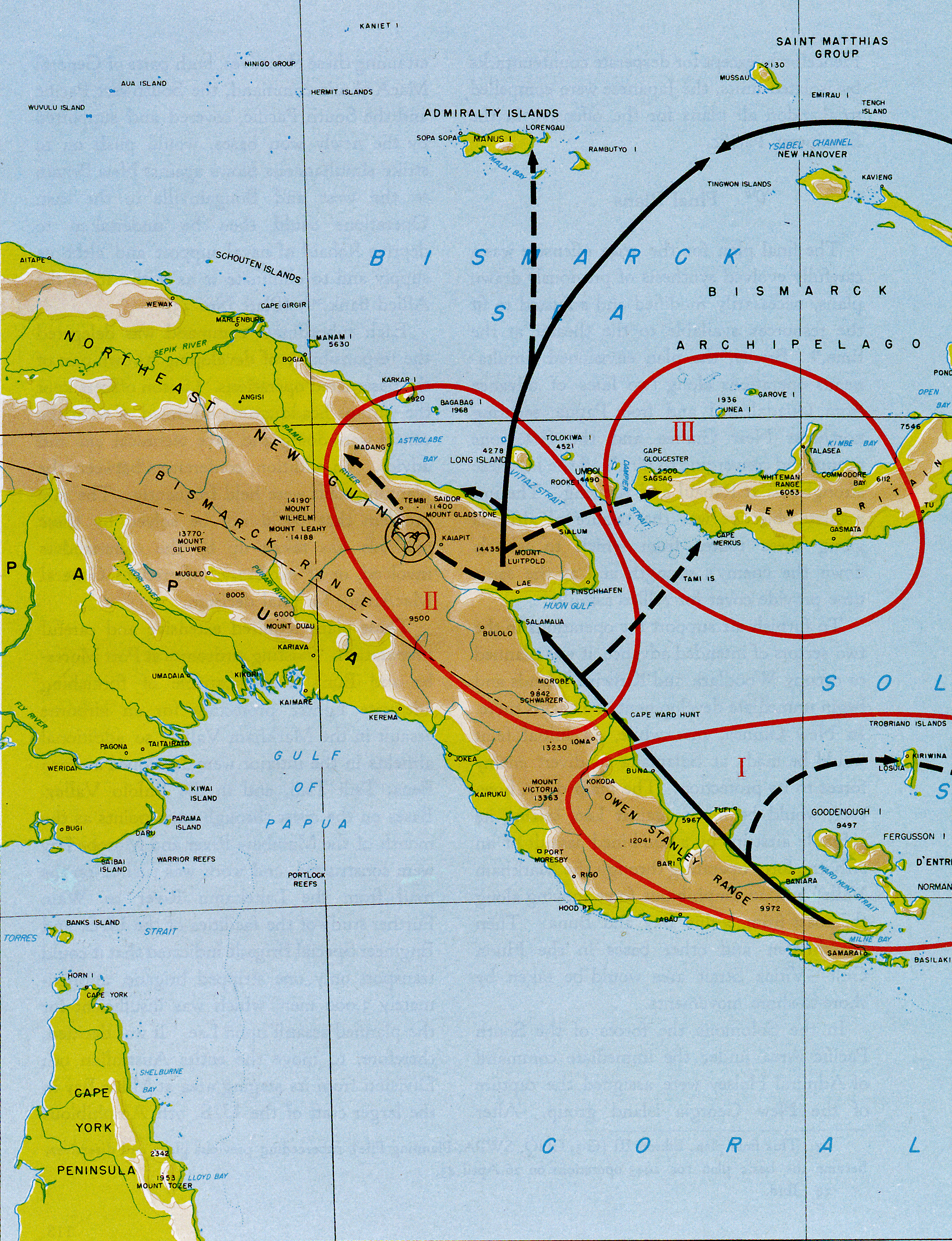
A map depicting the Elkton III Plan, March 1943.

In July 1942, the United States Joint Chiefs of Staff approved a series of operations (collectively called Operation Cartwheel) by General Douglas MacArthur, the Supreme Commander, South West Pacific Area (SWPA), against the Japanese bastion at Rabaul, which blocked any Allied advance along the northern coast of New Guinea toward the Philippines or north toward the main Japanese naval base at Truk. In keeping with the overall Allied grand strategy of defeating Nazi Germany first, the immediate aim of these operations was not the defeat of Japan but merely the reduction of the threat posed by Japanese base at Rabaul to air and sea communications between the United States and Australia.

In 1942 and early 1943, MacArthur's forces fought off a series of Japanese offensives in Papua in the Kokoda Track campaign, Battle of Milne Bay, Battle of Buna–Gona, the Battle of Wau and the Battle of the Bismarck Sea. Following these victories, the initiative passed to the Allies. At the Pacific Military Conference in Washington, D.C., in March 1943, MacArthur's plans were reviewed by the Joint Chiefs of Staff. The chiefs were unable to supply all the requested resources, so the plans had to be scaled back, with the capture of Rabaul postponed to 1944. On 6 May 1943, MacArthur's General Headquarters (GHQ) in Brisbane officially informed subordinate commands of the next phase of operations, which were to:

1. Occupy Kiriwina and Woodlark Islands and establish air forces thereon.
2. Seize the Lae–Salamaua–Finschhafen–Madang area and establish air forces therein.
3. Occupy western New Britain, establishing air forces at Cape Gloucester, Arawe and Gasmata.

The second part was assigned to General Sir Thomas Blamey's New Guinea Force, which was a mainly Australian formation. As a result, "it became obvious that any military offensive in 1943 would have to be carried out mainly by the Australian Army, just as during the bitter campaigns of 1942."

=== Japanese ===
In early 1942, the Japanese began making plans for the capture of the Salamaua–Lae area, which according to Kengoro Tanaka they desired as part of plans "to control the sea area to the east and north of Australia" due to the airfields located in the region. Lae was subsequently secured by a battalion of naval troops in February–March 1942. Lae was then developed into a significant forward base for Japanese aircraft, while Salamaua was invested with a naval garrison. In December that year, the Japanese began reinforcing Lae as they sought to shore up their southern flanks after the failure of operations to capture Port Moresby. By January 1943, the total strength of Japanese forces around Salamaua–Lae was around 6,500. Its strategic position, adjacent to the Solomon Sea, meant that it was the main Japanese base in the region, and throughout 1943 plans were made to hold both Lae and Salamaua.

By 1943, the Japanese maintained separate army and navy headquarters at Rabaul which cooperated with each other but were responsible to different higher authorities. Naval forces came under the Southeast Area Fleet, commanded by Vice Admiral Jinichi Kusaka. Army forces came under General Hitoshi Imamura's Eighth Area Army, consisting of the XVII Army in the Solomon Islands, Lieutenant General Hatazō Adachi's XVIII Army in New Guinea, and the 6th Air Division, based at Rabaul. As a result of the destruction of a convoy carrying reinforcements in the Battle of the Bismarck Sea, the Japanese decided not send any more convoys to Lae, but instead to land troops at Hansa Bay and Wewak and move them forward to Lae by barge or submarine. In the long run they hoped to complete a road over the Finisterre Range and thence to Lae through the Ramu and Markham Valleys.

Imamura ordered Adachi to capture the Allied bases at Wau, Bena Bena and Mount Hagen. To support these operations, Imperial General Headquarters transferred the 7th Air Division to New Guinea. On 27 July 1943, Lieutenant General Kumaichi Teramoto's Fourth Air Army was assigned to Imamura's command to control the 6th and 7th Air Divisions, the 14th Air Brigade and some miscellaneous squadrons. By June, Adachi had three divisions in New Guinea: the 41st Division at Wewak and the 20th Division around Madang, both recently arrived from Palau, and the 51st Division in the Salamaua area, a total of about 80,000 men. Of these only the 51st Division was in contact with the enemy. Like Blamey, Adachi faced formidable difficulties of transportation and supply just to bring his troops into battle.

== Geography ==
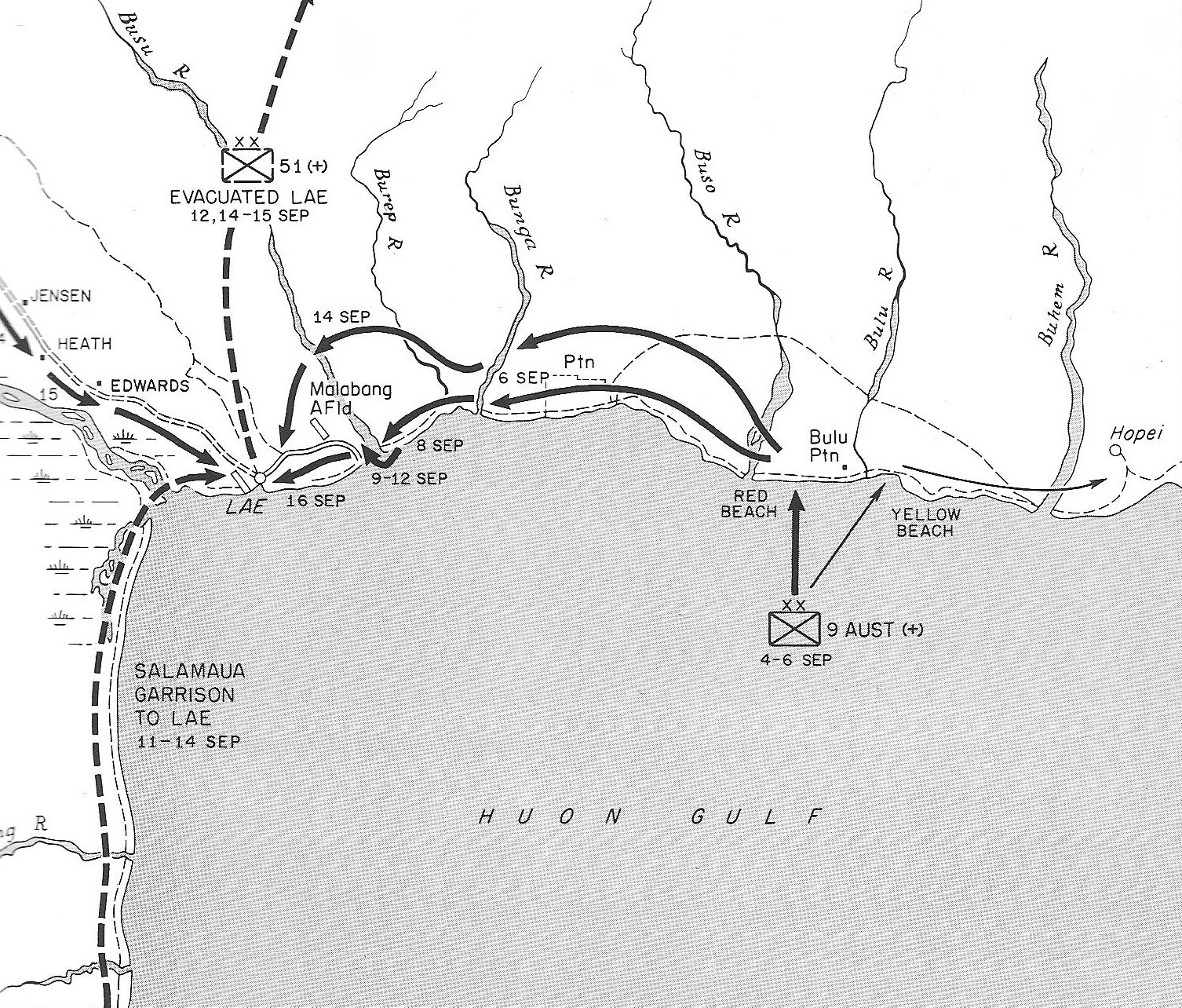
Map of the advance on Lae, September 1943

Lae lies on the western base of the Huon Peninsula, on the southern side of the Huon Gulf. The area was flat, and generally well-drained. It had been developed as a port to meet the needs of the gold fields to the south, but there was no harbour, and deep water offshore meant that the anchorages were limited. The tidal range was small, with 3-foot-3-inch (0.99 m) spring tides and 2-foot (0.61 m) neaps, and there were no coral reefs. The beaches to the east of Lae were suitable for landing craft. They were composed of firm black sand or shingle, and were about 20 yards (18 m) wide. But they had few exits, and for the most part were backed by dense jungle and mangrove swamps. There were no roads. The area was intercut by streams and rivers, the most important of which were the Burep and Busu Rivers. While neither wide nor deep, with firm, stoney bottoms, they were swift-flowing, with no fords, and so presented an obstacle to troops crossing.

== Planning ==
The landing would be made by Major General George Wootten's 9th Division, veterans of the siege of Tobruk and the First and Second Battles of El Alamein. It had returned to Australia from the Middle East after El Alamein, and been re-equipped, re-organised and re-trained for jungle operations around Kairi on the Atherton Tablelands in Queensland. Training in amphibious warfare was conducted nearby at Trinity Beach in Cairns with the American 2nd Engineer Special Brigade. This brigade was a large formation, with an establishment strength of 354 officers, 16 warrant officers and 6,806 enlisted men. Each of its three boat battalions had 120 small LCVPs and 12 larger LCMs, which they assembled themselves at a facility near Cairns. The 2nd Engineer Special Brigade was trained and equipped for "shore-to-shore" operations, over a maximum distance of 60 miles (100 km).

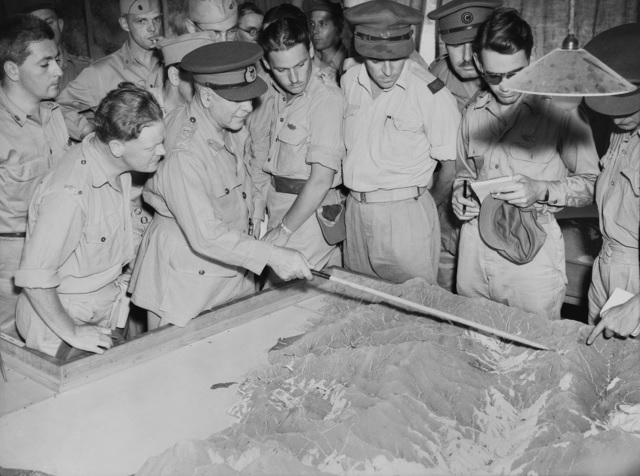
Blamey briefs the news media using a scale model of the target area

The original concept was for a brigade of the 9th Division to be ferried along the coastline of New Guinea from a forward base at Morobe. The more Blamey thought about the prospect of doing this under the noses of the Japanese air base at Lae, the more hazardous it seemed. In May he went back to MacArthur and obtained approval for the operation to be modified to employ the entire 9th Division, and that they be carried in additional large landing craft operated by the VII Amphibious Force. Also known as Task Force 76, this was part of the US Navy's Seventh Fleet. It was commanded by Rear Admiral Daniel E. Barbey, and operated large ocean-going landing ships such as the LST, LCI and LCT. The ships' greater range meant that the entire force could stage at Milne Bay and travel directly to Lae from there. In July and August 1943, the 9th Division moved up to Milne Bay, where Barbey had already established his headquarters on board the USS Rigel.

As it was the first significant amphibious operation mounted by Australian forces since Gallipoli, extensive planning was put into the capture of Lae. Indeed, it was the first major operation for which the Australian Army was able to conduct long term forward planning, with deliberate planning beginning six months prior. Wooten deliberately chose landing sites beyond the range of Japanese artillery in Lae. "Red Beach" was to the east of the mouth of the Buso River, roughly 15 kilometres (9.3 mi) east of Lae, and "Yellow Beach" was a further 2 kilometres (1.2 mi) east, across the Bulu River. This was the first time in SWPA that beaches were designated with colours. The left end of the beach was marked with a solid red panel mounted on tent poles, the right with one alternating red and white. At night, the left would have a red light, and the right one alternating red and white. Yellow beach was marked the same way, with yellow instead of red. Maps and models of the landing sites were made, and kept closely guarded. Soldiers were made familiar with models of the beaches where they would be landing, but the names were kept secret. Rehearsals were conducted on Normanby Island.

Order of arrival of landing craft and stores on Red and Yellow Beaches

A series of meetings involving Wooten, Barbey, Edmund Herring (Wooten's superior as commander of I Corps), Colonel Merian C. Cooper from the Fifth Air Force, and Air Commodore Joe Hewitt from the RAAF, reached agreement, or at least compromise, on many points. Wooten wanted at least 10 days' reserve rations. This meant that some stores would have to be transported in bulk, and not pre-loaded on trucks as Barbey initially wanted. Loading the stores onto trucks was an inefficient use of shipping space, but permitted quick unloading of the LSTs, as the trucks could simply be driven off. The 9th Division did not have sufficient trucks for this, but 200 trucks earmarked for the US Advanced Base at Lae were borrowed from USASOS. Barbey would not allow loaded vehicles on the tank decks of the LSTs, as this was a fire hazard, so bulk stores were carried there instead.

Ammunition requirements were based on experience in the desert, there being no reliable data on usage in SWPA due to acute supply difficulties. Some 1,200 long tons (1,200 t) of ammunition was drawn from the 10th Advanced Ammunition Depot at Milne Bay for the 25-pounders of the 2/12th Field Regiment and the Bofors 40 mm guns of the 2/4th Light Antiaircraft Regiment. The 9th Division also had two shore fire control parties from the 1st Australian Naval Bombardment Group to coordinate naval gunfire support, who had been specially trained at the Flinders Naval Depot in Victoria.

Wooten initially wanted a night landing, which would give tactical surprise and maximise the time for unloading the landing ships before Japanese aircraft put in an appearance; but there would be no moon on 4 September, so Barbey was uncertain that he would be able to correctly locate the beaches. H-Hour was therefore set at 06:30, which was twenty minutes after sunrise. Because the air force had commitments to support the 7th Division's landing at Nadzab the following day, air cover would not be available in the afternoon. Barbey therefore wanted the ships to depart at 11:00. This raised the question of whether the ships could be unloaded in just 4½ hours. Barbey gave assurances that unloading would continue even under Japanese air attack. For Australian officers with memories of the Tobruk Ferry Service, where the Royal Navy and Royal Australian Navy had lost 25 ships keeping the port's garrison supplied, the US Navy's attitude was not good enough.

A key part of Blamey's plan was for Australian and US forces to maintain pressure on the Japanese garrison around Salamaua to the south-west in the lead up to the landing in an effort to draw Japanese reinforcements away from Lae. In this they were completely successful; the Japanese 51st Division continued to reinforce the position around Salamaua, with thousands of Japanese troops, including elements of several infantry regiments and an artillery regiment, being moved to the area throughout the campaign. Allied intelligence estimated that there were 7,250 Japanese soldiers in Lae, of whom 5,100 were in combat units.

== Battle ==
=== Landing ===
Brigadier Victor Windeyer's 20th Infantry Brigade departed Milne Bay on 2 September. The first waves were carried in destroyer transports (APDs), old destroyers that had been converted to use as high-speed amphibious ships; the USS Brooks, Gilmer, Humphreys and Sands. Amphibian engineer scouts from the 2nd Engineer Special Brigade's 532nd Engineer Boat and Shore Regiment (EBSR) accompanied them. The rest of the 20th Infantry Brigade travelled less comfortably in the VII Amphibious Force's LCIs and LSTs. The Fifth Air Force carried out raids on the Japanese bases at Madan on 1 September and Wewak on 2 September in support of the operation, sinking a couple of merchant ships totalling 10,000 tons in Wewak harbour.

The convoy stopped for a few hours at Buna on 3 September, where men on the LCIs were allowed to disembark. At around 12:15, nine Japanese Betty bombers attacked the landing craft at Morobe, but inflicted no damage or casualties. On the night of 3/4 September, the final voyage to the landing beaches began. The landing was preceded by a short naval bombardment from five US destroyers. It was unopposed by Japanese land forces, with the small number of Japanese that were guarding the shore choosing to abandon their posts rather than fight.

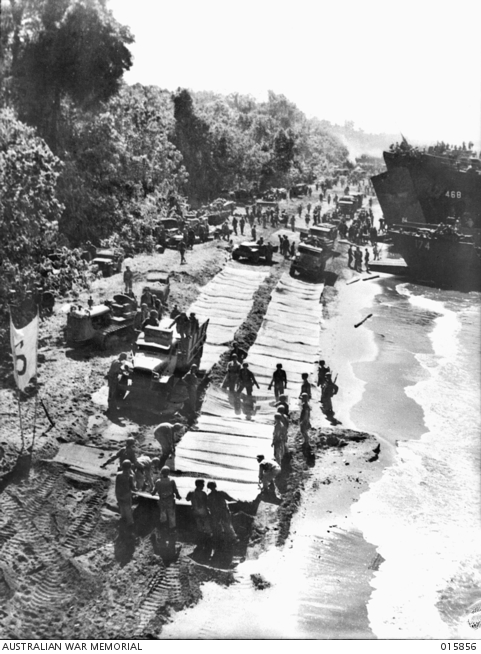
The US 532nd Engineer Boat and Shore Regiment lays beach mats to allow vehicles to move along the sand. LST-468 and LCT-174 unload in the background.

There was resistance from the air, though. As the fifth wave of seven LCIs was coming in to Red Beach, they were attacked by six Zeke fighters and three Betty bombers that dropped twelve bombs. One hit the deck of USS LCI-339 forward of the conning tower; another two were near misses. Badly damaged and riddled by bullets and fragments, the ship caught fire. LCI-339 remained on the beach, where she served as a landmark for Japanese aircraft. She was eventually towed off the beach, but then drifted onto a reef and became a total loss. USS LCI-341 suffered a near miss that tore a huge hole in its side. Eight Australians were killed, including Lieutenant Colonel R. E. Wall, the commanding officer of the 2/23rd Infantry Battalion, and 45 were wounded.

The landing operation continued despite the air attacks and within four hours of the first landing craft being lowered into the water, around 8,000 men had been put ashore. During the initial phase of the landing the 2/13th Infantry Battalion landed at Yellow Beach securing the beachhead, after which it pushed patrols to the west, to link up with the 2/15th Infantry Battalion – which had landed at Red Beach – before advancing east towards the Hopoi Mission Station to secure the right flank of the Allied lodgement. The 2/17th Infantry Battalion came ashore on Red Beach behind the 2/15th, and pushed itself towards the west to force its way across the Buso River, and establish a beachhead on its opposite bank. The 26th Infantry Brigade then followed the 20th Brigade ashore, conducting a passage of lines with the 20th Brigade, moving through their position and then pushing west, temporarily assuming control of the 2/17th Infantry Battalion.

Engineers laid wire mesh on the beaches, felled trees, built roads and established supply dumps. While the LSTs were unloaded quickly enough, the seven bulk loaded LCTs were not, due to insufficient troops being designated to help unloading. The last was not unloaded until 14:30. At 13:00, six LSTs heading for Red Beach were attacked by a force of about 70 Japanese aircraft. Some 48 Lockheed P-38 Lightnings were vectored to assist. USS LST-473 was rocked by two bomb hits and two near misses from Val dive bombers. Eight Americans were killed and 37 Americans and Australians wounded. USS LST-471 was torpedoed on the port side aft by a Betty bomber; 43 Americans and Australians were killed and 30 were wounded. Particularly hard hit were the commandos of the 2/4th Independent Company, which lost 34 dead and 7 wounded.

The remaining ships continued to Red Beach, arriving on schedule at 23:00. On their way back USS LST-452 and LST-458 took the two crippled LSTs in tow, and brought them back to Morobe. They then took on their cargo, and later took it to Red Beach. The wounded were taken to Buna by Humphreys. Japanese aircraft attacked the beach at 15:30. An ammunition dump exploded and a fuel dump was set on fire. The 532nd EBSR lost one man killed and 12 wounded.

The following day, after the 26th Brigade had advanced the beachhead about 6 miles (9.7 km) from the initial lodgement, the divisional reserve – the 24th Infantry Brigade – was brought ashore on the evening of 5/6 September. In the days following the landing, the Australians advanced with two brigades forward: the 24th on the coast and the 26th about 4 miles (6.4 km) inland. On the right of the 26th Brigade, flank security was provided by the 2/4th Independent Company, while the 20th Brigade remained behind to secure the beachhead.

=== Advance on Lae ===
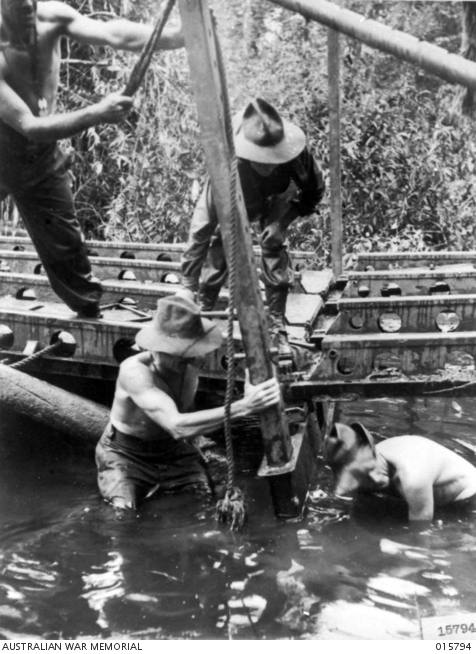
Sappers erect a pontoon bridge over the Bunga River on the track to Lae to facilitate passage of artillery

Following the landing east of Lae, the 7th Division, having concentrated in Port Moresby, was flown into Nadzab following its capture by the US 503rd Parachute Infantry Regiment (503rd PIR) on 5 September. Tasked with advancing from the north-west, its main role was to act as a buffer between the 9th Division and Japanese reinforcements which might try to move down through the Markham and Ramu Valleys. The 9th Division's initial advance along the coast met with limited resistance, with the largest Japanese elements being mainly company-sized. In response to the landing at Nadzab, the Japanese command ordered Lieutenant General Hidemitsu Nakano's 51st Division to reinforce Ryoichi Shoge's heavily entrenched garrison at Lae, falling back from the Salamaua region. There were numerous small creeks and rivers west of the Buso, including four major rivers and on the inland route, the 2/23rd Infantry Battalion, having crossed the Buso on the first day, began a series of what author Joseph Morgan has described as "treacherous river crossings and hard slogs...through the jungle".

Pushing their way across the Bunga and Buiem Rivers, the 2/23rd fanned out through Apo village while maintaining contact with the 2/17th Infantry Battalion by signal cable. Around the Burep River, the 2/23rd was held up by the terrain and as a result the commander decided to halt and form a battalion defensive position. A platoon under Sergeant Don Lawrie was pushed forward near the mouth of the river as a protection measure to provide early warning. On 6 September, a company of Japanese attacked the 2/23rd's main defensive position south of the Singaua Plantation on the western side of the Buiem River, alongside a company from the 2/24th Battalion. Having been alerted by Lawrie's platoon who had sent back two runners, the battalion was able to repel the attack, although numerous casualties were inflicted on the 2/23rd and the 2/17th by Japanese mortars. The Japanese company, numbering about 60 men, subsequently fell back towards Lawrie's platoon near the Bunga. Positioned on the Japanese line of retreat, the Australian platoon was subjected to six attacks. These were fended off over the course of the afternoon, and by evening, as heavy rain began to fall, the Australian platoon was able to break contact and withdraw back to the 2/23rd's main defensive position.

The Japanese assault on the 2/23rd subsequently delayed the 9th Division's advance for several days, and these would eventually prove significant as in that time, the rain set in, flooding the numerous waterways that forked inland from the coast. Covered with heavy fire from the opposite bank, they would prove difficult for the Australians to cross. As the advance continued, stores were pushed forward from Red Beach, and landed by LCVs and LCMs around Apo Fishing Village on 6/7 September, and then again on 7 September around the Singaua Plantation, from where both the 24th and 26th Infantry Brigades undertook a resupply before the advance continued. The going was slow, with the ground saturated, and the thick jungle and kunai grass along the route of advance delayed the troops who had to cut several tracks through the foliage. On the inland route, the 2/24th led the way towards the Burep River, while along the coast the 2/28th relieved the 2/32nd. As they reached the Burep, the two brigades separated, with the 26th advancing alongside the Burep for several miles before crossing it further inland and then driving towards the Busu.

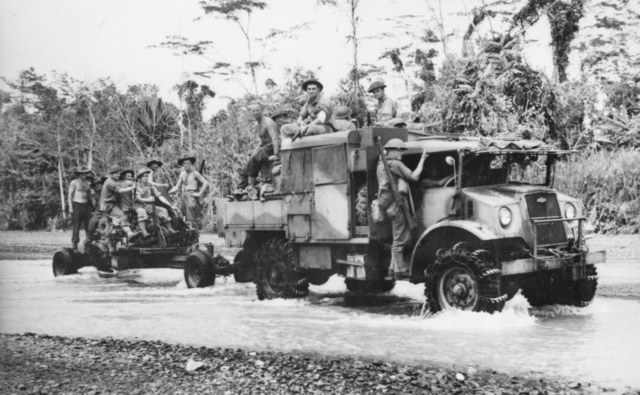
A number 6 artillery tractor tows a Bofors 40 mm gun across the Burep River on the way to Lae

By 8 September, the commander of the Japanese 51st Division, Nakano, gave the order for his forces and those in Lae to begin their withdrawal northwards, as it became clear that the twin drives on the town threatened them with encirclement. The same day, though, the Australians came up against the most significant obstacle to their advance on Lae – the Busu River – which at its widest was 700 metres (2,300 ft) across, and 1.8 metres (5 ft 11 in) deep. Three days of heavy rain had flooded the river, making it treacherous to cross; however, the need to maintain the initiative forced the Australians to launch a hazardous crossing without bridging equipment or boats. On the coast, the 2/28th Infantry Battalion, under the command of Lieutenant Colonel Colin Norman, attempted to run a cable across the river. This failed after the soldier who made the crossing was killed on the opposite bank by a squad of Japanese. Norman then shifted his focus to the mouth of the river, where there was a small central island that could be exploited to provide some cover for the assaulting troops. Covered by mortars and heavy machine guns, the Western Australians fixed bayonets and advanced in company lots, with the men strung out in extended line. The Japanese opened up with their own mortars and machine guns from well concealed positions on the opposite bank. Thirteen Australians drowned in the crossing, while dozens more were swept away and had to be rescued by troops from neighbouring units. Nevertheless, the 2/28th pushed through, subsequently securing a beachhead on the opposite bank.

The weather continued to hamper the 9th Division's advance. The 26th Brigade, further inland, remained stuck on the eastern side of the Busu. On 10 September, the commandos providing flank security managed to get across the Sankwep River, close to its confluence with the Busu, pushing a kunda bridge across. Shortly afterwards, they clashed with a small party of Japanese attempting to advance towards the bridge, and several Japanese were killed. To reinvigorate the 26th, engineer support was brought up. The 2/7th Field Company was pushing a jeep track forward with the help of the 2/48th, and they subsequently arrived with boats, ropes and cables, and several attempts were made to get across, all of which eventually failed as the engineers came under fire from the opposite bank. Heavy clashes later took place as the Australians and Japanese fought desperately in the swamp around the crossing. As it became uncertain whether the 26th would be able to force their way across, a company from the 2/48th was sent south to use the 24th Brigade's crossing and then advance north along the western bank of the Busu to help secure the brigade's beachhead when it finally did get across. on 13 September further engineer stores arrived, including bridging equipment and folding boats, and the following day a Small Box Girder bridge was pushed across despite heavy fire from the opposite bank, allowing the 26th Brigade to get across the Busu on 14 September.

The 26th Infantry Brigade's leading elements immediately clashed with the Japanese on the opposite bank, as they worked to push two battalions towards Kamkamun and the Malahang Mission, to secure the sawmill to the south-west and the northern end of the Malahang airfield. Meanwhile, the 24th Infantry Brigade had pushed the 2/28th along the coast with a view advancing towards Malahang Anchorage, while the 2/32nd and 2/43rd invested Wagan to the south of Malahang airfield. In addition to the weather, the Allied supply situation also proved problematic, with the geography making resupply efforts difficult, while service politics led to arguments between military and naval commanders developing over misunderstandings about the capabilities of the navy and the risks involved in operating close to the shore. These factors combined to stymie the 9th Division's progress and as a result, the 7th Division's troops eventually beat the 9th in reaching the town, with its 25th Infantry Brigade – having fought a sharp action around Jensen's and Heath's Plantations – entering Lae on the morning of 16 September, just ahead of the 24th Infantry Brigade, which had taken the airfield around Malahang the day before.

== Base development ==
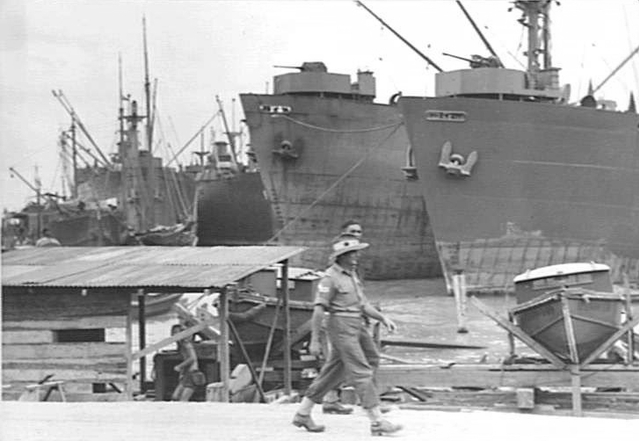
Liberty ships unload at the docks at Lae in March 1944

Brigadier David Whitehead of the 26th Infantry Brigade assumed responsibility for Lae after its capture. Under his direction, garbage was burned, Japanese bodies were cremated, and bomb craters, shell holes and Japanese trench latrines were filled in. American and Australian malaria control units sprayed mosquito breeding grounds. He handed over responsibility for the town to US Brigadier General Carl W. Connell, the commander of US Base E. The advance party of Lieutenant Colonel O. A. Kessels' Australian Lae Base Sub Area headquarters arrived by air on 18 September, followed by the main body by sea on 30 September. To control the Australian and American bases, Herring created the Lae Fortress under Major General Edward Milford.

Lae was not intended to be an air base, but the 9th Division wanted to use the Lae Drome for casualty evacuation and artillery spotting by No. 4 Squadron RAAF. By 18 September, it had been extended to 5,000 feet (1,500 m) and widened to 200 feet (61 m), allowing four of No. 4 Squadron's CAC Wirraways to land. The closure of the Markham Valley Road on 7 October due to heavy rainfall meant that the airbases at Nadzab and Gusap had to be maintained by air. Fuel was shipped to Lae in 44-gallon drums, and then flown to Nadzab. At one point, there was a take off or landing at Lae Drome every 26 seconds. Only after a Herculean effort by the US 842nd Engineer Aviation Battalion was the road reopened on 15 December.

Development of Lae as a port, on the other hand, was envisaged from the start; but when the town was captured, the port was blocked by sunken barges and debris. The only discharge facilities were two rickety jetties unable to hold trucks. The first cargo was delivered by LST, and brought ashore over the beach by DUKWs, LCMs and lighters. Australian and American DUKWs were operated as a common pool. Initially, the US Navy would only allow the LSTs to arrive at night, and they had to shove off before daybreak. Only in November did it allow them to operate in daylight. Sunken Japanese barges were cleared away by a 150-ton floating crane. American engineers then installed a floating dock, which was towed to Lae in sections. It opened on 20 October, and a Type C1 ship, the Cape Kreig, discharged there that day. A new dock was completed on 23 November, although it was used to unload the Liberty ship Fremont Older on 15 November. A fuel jetty was built, along with a bulk petroleum storage facility, and the first tanker discharged there on 20 November. A 4-inch pipeline was run through to Nadzab.

== Aftermath ==
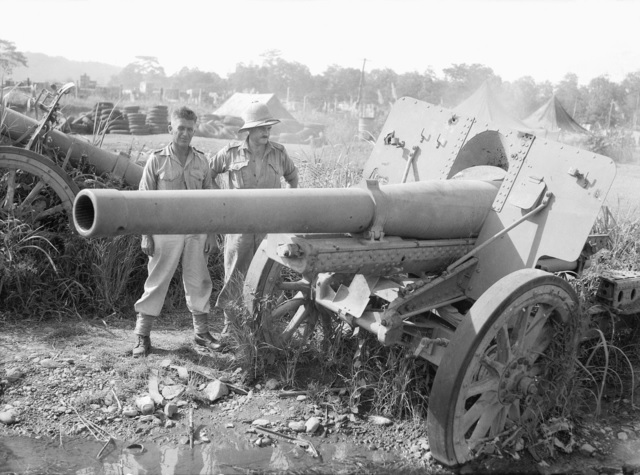
A Japanese gun captured by the AIF at Lae

After the capture of Lae, the Japanese high command determined that a withdrawal to a new line of defence was required. A total of about 9,000 Japanese troops subsequently began withdrawing across the Busu River and then through the Saruwaged and Finisterre Ranges to the north-east coast, while efforts were made to reinforce the Huon Peninsula, with the 20th Division being transferred from Madang to Finschhafen. The Allies, who had captured a copy of Nakano's withdrawal order when troops from the 2/25th Infantry Battalion clashed with a Japanese force on 13 September, attempted to cut off the withdrawing troops and subsequently there were heavy clashes along the Markham Valley Road, with troops from the Australian 25th Infantry Brigade and 503rd PIR engaged. During the withdrawal many Japanese troops ran short of food and abandoned essential equipment, including artillery, small arms and load carriage equipment; they subsequently reached their objective in the middle of October, having lost a further 600 to 1,000 men on the march. Japanese strength returns indicated that the 51st Division had 6,417 men, of whom 1,271 were sick. The 9th Division lost 77 killed, 397 wounded and 73 missing.

The Allies subsequently launched a follow-up campaign on the Huon Peninsula, with a landing at Scarlet Beach by the 20th Infantry Brigade. At the same time, the 22nd Infantry Battalion, an Australian Militia unit that had landed as part of the 4th Infantry Brigade on 10/11 September to relieve the 2/13th and 2/15th Infantry Battalions around the beachhead to free them up for the advance west on Lae, followed the Japanese that were withdrawing to the east, marching from Hopoi Mission Station to Finschhafen, with a view to placing pressure on the Japanese southern flank. This feat was described by the Kalgoorlie Miner as the "greatest march" of the New Guinea campaign and in 10 days the battalion covered 50 miles (80 km) of rugged terrain.

The 7th Division would later advance on Dumpu through the Markham and Ramu Valleys, and over the Finisterre Range on their way towards Madang during the Finisterre Range campaign. This advance, coupled with the US seizure of New Georgia gave the Allies access to vital airfields from which they were able to project air power.
