= USS LST-471 =

LST-1-class tank landing ship

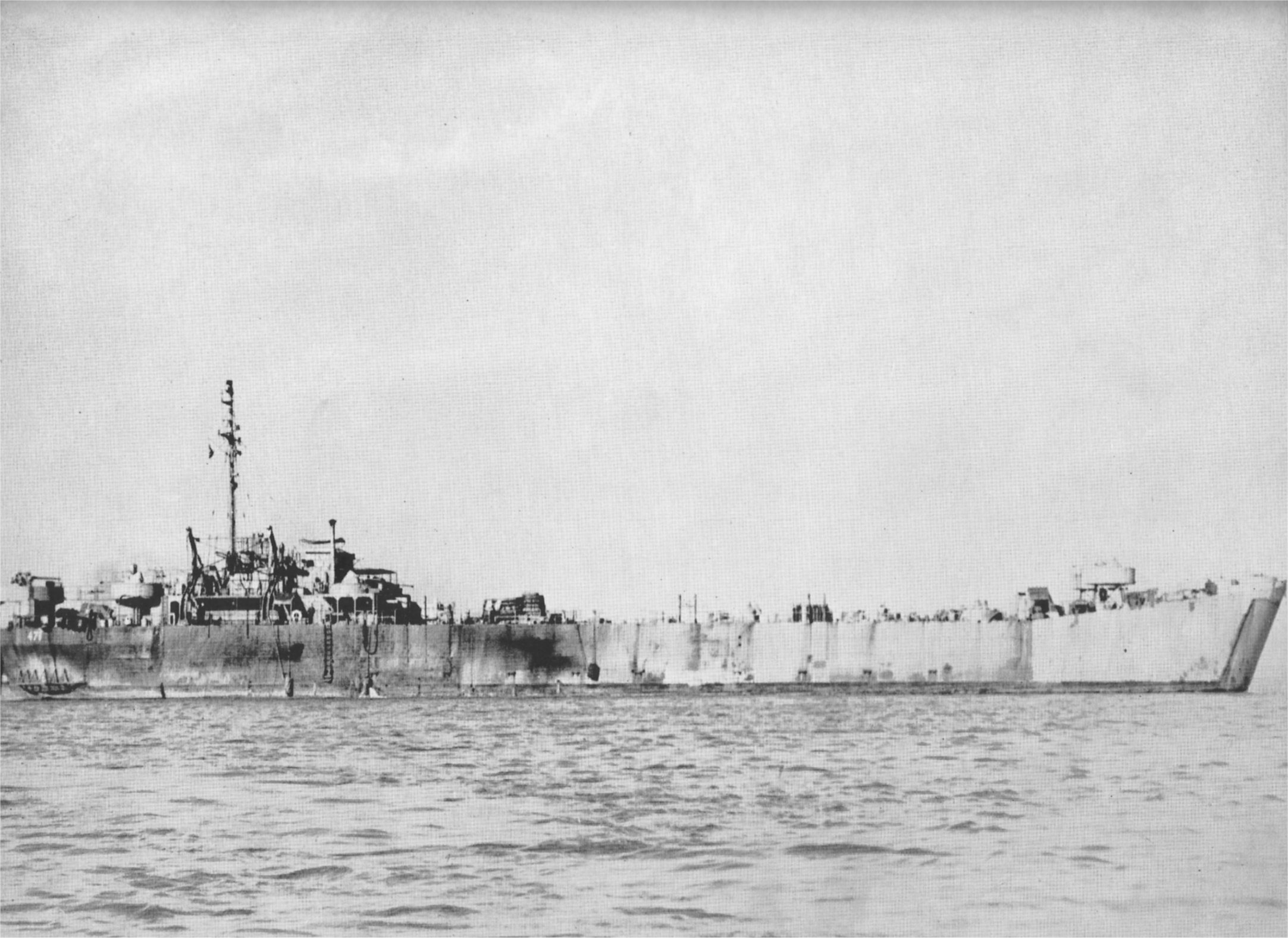
- USS LST-471, at anchor in the South Pacific in 1944.

History

United States
- Name: LST-471
- Ordered: as a Type S3-M-K2 hull, MCE hull 991
- Builder: Kaiser Shipbuilding Company, Vancouver, Washington
- Yard number: 175
- Laid down: 29 October 1942
- Launched: 3 December 1942
- Commissioned: 11 March 1943
- Decommissioned: 26 February 1946
- Stricken: 12 April 1946
- Identification: Hull symbol: LST-471; Code letters: NFYA
- Honors and awards: 5 × battle stars
- Fate: Sold for scrapping, 21 January 1948, beached en route to scrapper, 1948

General characteristics
- Class & type: LST-1-class tank landing ship
- Displacement: 4,080 long tons (4,145 t) full load; 2,160 long tons (2,190 t) landing
- Length: 328 ft (100 m) oa
- Beam: 50 ft (15 m)
- Draft: Full load: 8 ft 2 in (2.49 m) forward; 14 ft 1 in (4.29 m) aft; Landing at 2,160 t: 3 ft 11 in (1.19 m) forward; 9 ft 10 in (3.00 m) aft
- Installed power: 2 × 900 hp (670 kW) Electro-Motive Diesel 12-567A diesel engines; 1,700 shp (1,300 kW)
- Propulsion: 1 × Falk main reduction gears; 2 × Propellers
- Speed: 12 kn (22 km/h; 14 mph)
- Range: 24,000 nmi (44,000 km; 28,000 mi) at 9 kn (17 km/h; 10 mph) while displacing 3,960 long tons (4,024 t)
- Boats & landing craft carried: 2 or 6 x LCVPs
- Capacity: 2,100 tons oceangoing maximum; 350 tons main deckload
- Troops: 16 officers, 147 enlisted men
- Complement: 13 officers, 104 enlisted men
- Armament: Varied, ultimate armament; 2 × twin 40 mm (1.57 in) Bofors guns; 4 × single 40 mm Bofors guns; 12 × 20 mm (0.79 in) Oerlikon cannons

USS LST-471 was a United States Navy LST-1-class tank landing ship used in the Asiatic-Pacific Theater during World War II. As with many of her class, the ship was never named. Instead, she was referred to by her hull designation.

== Construction ==
LST-471 was laid down on 29 October 1942, under Maritime Commission (MARCOM) contract, MC hull 991, by Kaiser Shipyards, Vancouver, Washington; launched 3 December 1942; and commissioned on 11 March 1943.

== Service history ==
During World War II, LST-471 was assigned to the Asiatic-Pacific theater and participated in the following operations: the Lae occupation in September 1943; the Leyte operation in October and November 1944; the Lingayen Gulf landings in January 1945; the Mindanao Island landings in March 1945; and the Balikpapan operation in June and July 1945.

Following World War II, LST-471 returned to the United States and was decommissioned on 26 February 1946, and struck from the Navy list on 12 April, that same year. On 21 January 1948, the tank landing ship was sold to Hughes Bros., Inc., New York City, for scrap. She was beached during a storm while under tow off Rodanthe, North Carolina.

The wreck is located at 35.586412°N 75.459340°W

== Honors and awards ==
LST-471 earned five battle stars for her World War II service.

== Notes ==
Citations

== Bibliography ==
Online resources

- "LST-471". Dictionary of American Naval Fighting Ships. Naval History and Heritage Command. This article incorporates text from this source, which is in the public domain.
- "Kaiser Vancouver, Vancouver WA". www.ShipbuildingHistory.com. 27 November 2010.
- "USS LST-471". NavSource. 1 January 2016.
