= USS LST-473 =

S1C Hutchins, J Congressional Medal Of Honor

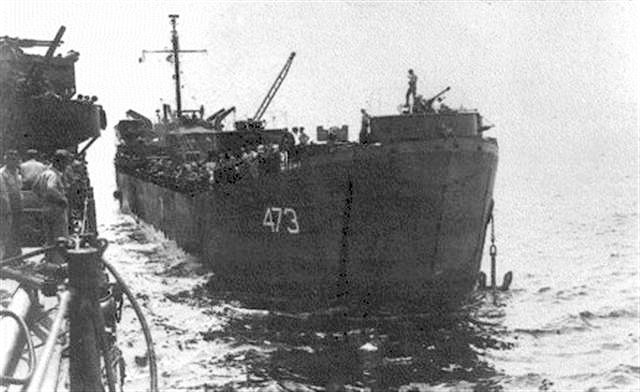
- USS LST-473, coming alongside while underway in the Southwest Pacific, date unknown.

History

United States
- Name: LST-473
- Builder: Kaiser Shipbuilding Company, Vancouver, Washington
- Yard number: 177
- Laid down: 10 July 1942
- Launched: 9 December 1942
- Commissioned: 16 March 1943
- Decommissioned: 18 March 1946
- Stricken: 17 April 1946
- Identification: Hull symbol: LST-473; Code letters: NGGV
- Honors and awards: 5 × battle stars
- Fate: Sold for scrapping, 21 April 1948

General characteristics
- Class & type: LST-1-class tank landing ship
- Displacement: 4,080 long tons (4,145 t) full load; 2,160 long tons (2,190 t) landing
- Length: 328 ft (100 m) oa
- Beam: 50 ft (15 m)
- Draft: Full load: 8 ft 2 in (2.49 m) forward; 14 ft 1 in (4.29 m) aft; Landing at 2,160 t: 3 ft 11 in (1.19 m) forward; 9 ft 10 in (3.00 m) aft
- Installed power: 2 × 900 hp (670 kW) Electro-Motive Diesel 12-567A diesel engines; 1,700 shp (1,300 kW)
- Propulsion: 1 × Falk main reduction gears; 2 × Propellers
- Speed: 12 kn (22 km/h; 14 mph)
- Range: 24,000 nmi (44,000 km; 28,000 mi) at 9 kn (17 km/h; 10 mph) while displacing 3,960 long tons (4,024 t)
- Boats & landing craft carried: 2 or 6 x LCVPs
- Capacity: 2,100 tons oceangoing maximum; 350 tons main deckload
- Troops: 16 officers, 147 enlisted men
- Complement: 13 officers, 104 enlisted men
- Armament: Varied, ultimate armament; 2 × twin 40 mm (1.57 in) Bofors guns; 4 × single 40 mm Bofors guns; 12 × 20 mm (0.79 in) Oerlikon cannons

USS LST-473 was a United States Navy LST-1-class tank landing ship used in the Asiatic-Pacific Theater during World War II. As with many of her class, the ship was never named. Instead, she was referred to by her hull designation.

== Construction ==
LST-473 was laid down on 10 July 1942, under Maritime Commission (MARCOM) contract, MC hull 993, by Kaiser Shipyards, Vancouver, Washington; launched 9 December 1942; and commissioned on 16 March 1943.

== Service history ==
During World War II, LST-473 was assigned to the Asiatic-Pacific theater and participated in the following operations: the Lae occupation in September 1943; the Leyte operation in October 1944; the Lingayen Gulf landings in January 1945; the Zambales-Subic Bay operation in January 1945; and the Mindanao Island landings in March 1945.

During the Lae landing LST 473 was attacked by a large number of Japanese planes and was severely damaged by several bombs that hit the ship. 8 men were killed in action and 14 others were seriously wounded. 4 members of her crew were highly decorated for their heroism during the attack. S1c Johnnie David Hutchins was posthumously awarded the Medal of Honor. S1c Frederick L. Erickson was awarded the Navy Cross and CPhM Nelson Tudor and Ensign J.K. Hayes were awarded the Silver Star.

LST-473 returned to the United States and was decommissioned on 18 March 1946. She was struck from the Navy list on 17 April, that same year. On 21 April 1948, the tank landing ship was sold to Hughes Bros., Inc., New York City, and subsequently scrapped.

== Honors and awards ==
LST-473 earned five battle stars for her service in World War II. Individual awards for heroism to her crew members made LST 473 one of the most highly decorated LSTs to serve during World War II.

== See also ==
- List of United States Navy LSTs
- List of United States Navy losses in World War II

== Notes ==
Citations

== Bibliography ==
Online resources

- "LST-473". Dictionary of American Naval Fighting Ships. Naval History and Heritage Command. 3 August 2015. This article incorporates text from this source, which is in the public domain.
- "Kaiser Vancouver, Vancouver WA". www.ShipbuildingHistory.com. 27 November 2010.
- "USS LST-473". NavSource. 31 October 2014.
