= Battle of Sansapor =

1944 battle of WW2's Pacific Theater

- Part of World War II, Pacific War
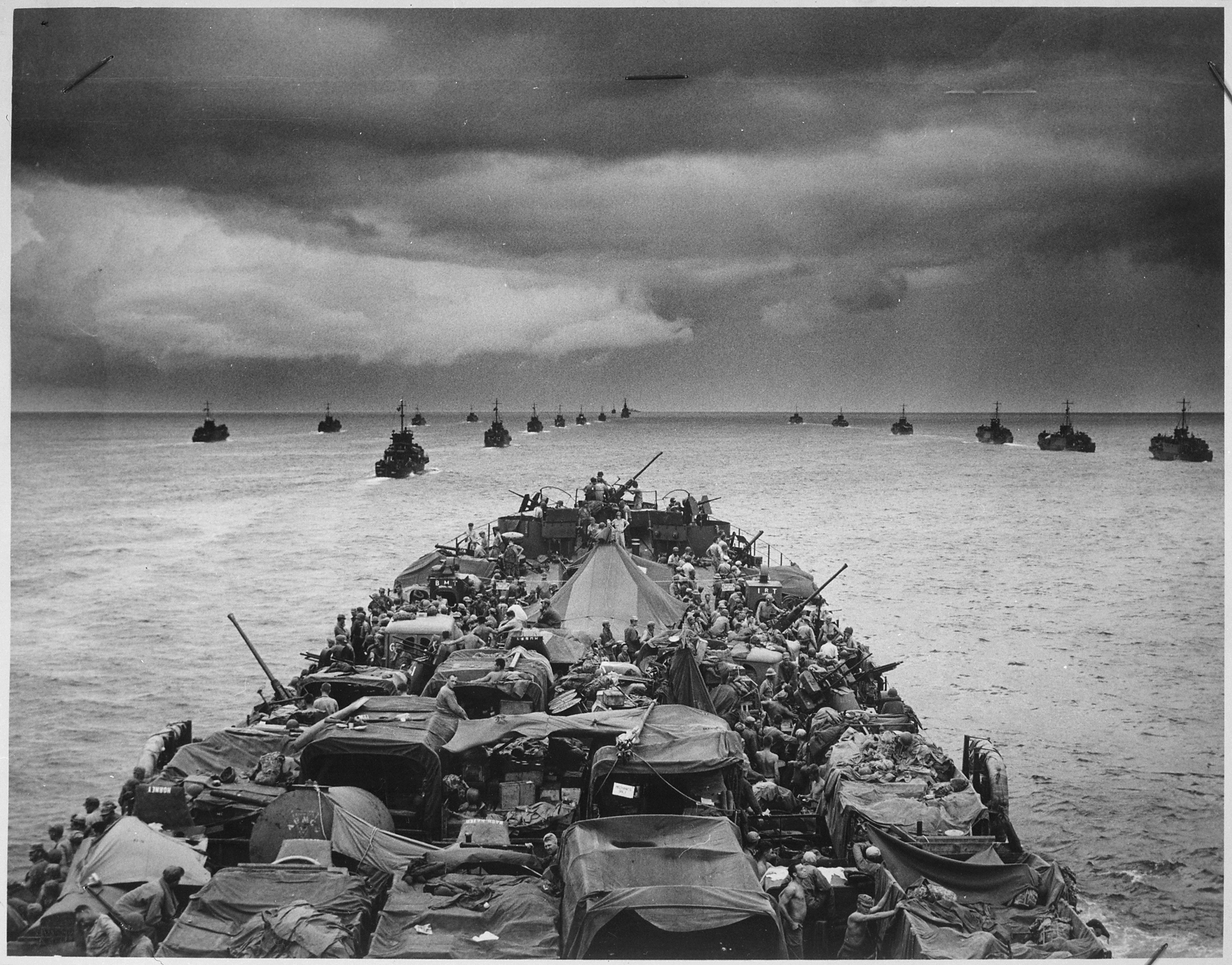
- Columns of troop-packed landing craft en route for the invasion of Sansapor.
Date	30 July – 31 August 1944
Location	Sansapor, Dutch New Guinea
Result	Allied victory

Belligerents
United States	Japan

Commanders and leaders
(United States) Franklin C. Sibert (United States) William Fechteler (United States) Russell S. Berkey	(Empire of Japan) Kokichi Ikeda

Strength
(United States) Typhoon Task Force: 6th Infantry Division; (United States) Task Force 77 (United States) Task Force 78	(Empire of Japan) 35th Division

Casualties and losses
14 killed 35 wounded	385 killed 215 captured

The Battle of Sansapor (Operation Globetrotter) was an amphibious landing and subsequent operations around Sansapor, Dutch New Guinea on the Vogelkop Peninsula during World War II.

== Naval force ==
Admiral William Fechteler's Attack Force (Task Force 77) was to have a D-Day groupment comprising 11 destroyers, 5 APDs, 16 LCIs, 3 rocket LCIs, 8 LSTs, 4 PCs, and 1 ATF. A Covering Force (Task Force 78), consisting of 1 heavy cruiser, 2 light cruisers, and 9 destroyers under the command of Admiral Russell Berkey, was to be available for support fire if needed.

In preparation for Operation Typhoon (code name for the US Army landings on the Vogelkop Peninsula), on 17 June 1944, S-47, under Lieutenant Lloyd V. Young, sailed from the Admiralty Islands for Waigeo, with the mission to insert elements of the Alamo Scouts, Allied Intelligence Bureau agents, terrain experts of the Fifth Air Force, and hydrographic survey men of the VII Amphibious Force. The reconnaissance force landed near Sausapor-Mar on 23 June where the party spent the week surveying the region. As a result of both this reconnaissance and aerial reconnaissance the assault landing was diverted to land 55 miles (89 km) northeast of Sorong.

== Landing force ==
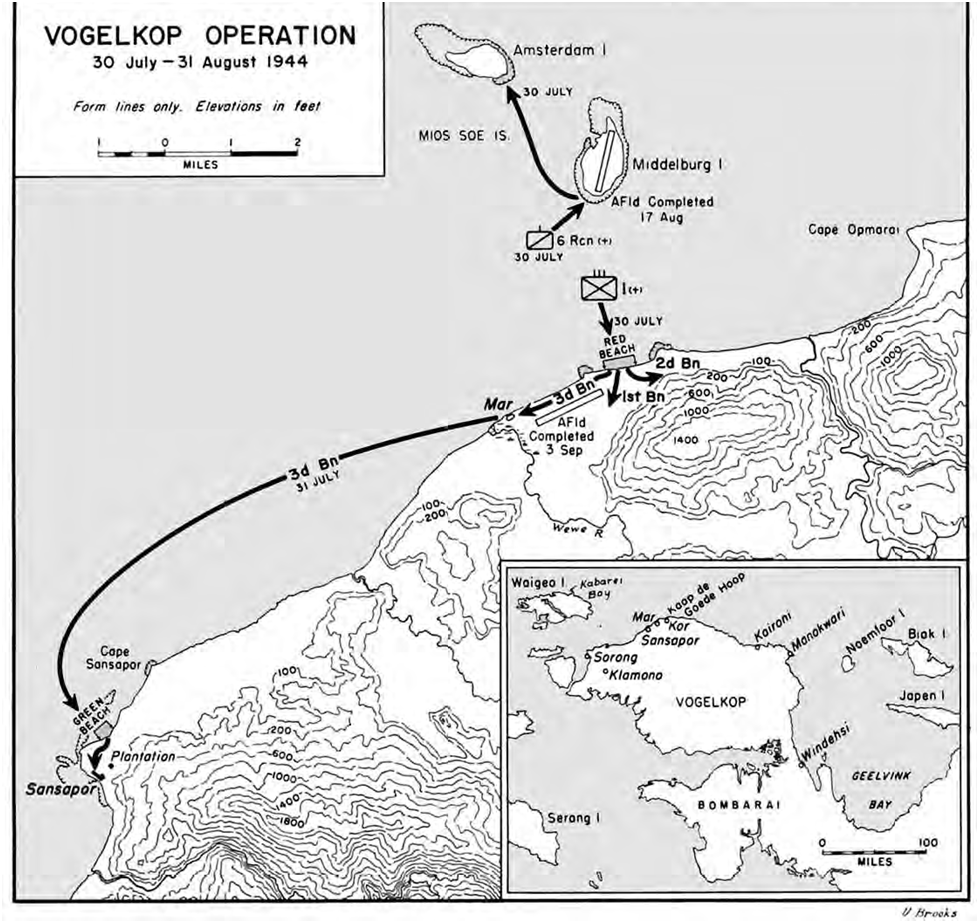
Operations map for Operation Typhoon in July–August 1944

On 30 July 1944, Operation Typhoon landed at Sansapar (Green Beach), Mar (Red Beach), Middelburg Island and Amsterdam Island. In charge of the Operation Typhoon ground forces was Major General Franklin C. Sibert, commanding general of the 6th Infantry Division. General Sibert was to command an organization designated the TYPHOON Task Force, which comprised the 6th Division (Reinforced), less the 20th Regimental Combat Team. Combat units for the D-Day echelon of the TYPHOON Task Force were the 1st Infantry Regiment, the 1st Battalion, 63d Infantry Regiment, the 1st Field Artillery Battalion, the 6th Cavalry Reconnaissance Troop, a company of the 6th Engineers, and four antiaircraft batteries.

All of the landings ultimately proved to be unopposed and it was not until 16 August that elements of the Japanese 35th Division were able to reach the area of the landings. By 31 August the 1-63rd Infantry had killed 155 Japanese and taken 42 prisoners. The American regiment lost 3 men killed and 4 wounded. The 1st Infantry, on the west flank, killed 197 Japanese and captured 154, while losing 4 men wounded itself. The 6th Cavalry Reconnaissance Troop, during its series of far flung patrols, killed 42 Japanese and captured 5 others. Total battle casualties for the TYPHOON Task Force from 30 July through 31 August were 14 killed, 35 wounded, and 9 injured. Japanese losses during the same period were estimated to be 385 killed and 215 captured.

Eventually, the runway for fighter aircraft was built on Middleburg Island and for bombers near Mar to the northeast (the landing strip is still visible to this day), although the control of Sausapor was vital for the security of the base to launch the campaign and remained an air warning radar station. Ships patrolled this area of the coastline throughout the month-long campaign, keeping the Japanese at bay. Operation Globetrotter ended on 31 August and General Douglas MacArthur's last point of landing on the way back to the Philippines was at Sansapor.

On 31 July, shore-to shore landings from Cape Opmarai were carried out at Sansapor. The Japanese garrison at Manokwari was cut off and attempted to retreat to Sorong.

== Base development ==
Airfields were built at Mar, Middleburg Island, Cape Opmarai and a flying boat base at Amsterdam Island. A radar station was also set up at Mar. Cape Opmarai Airfield is now a disused airfield.
