= 2/12th Field Regiment (Australia) =

Australian Army artillery regiment

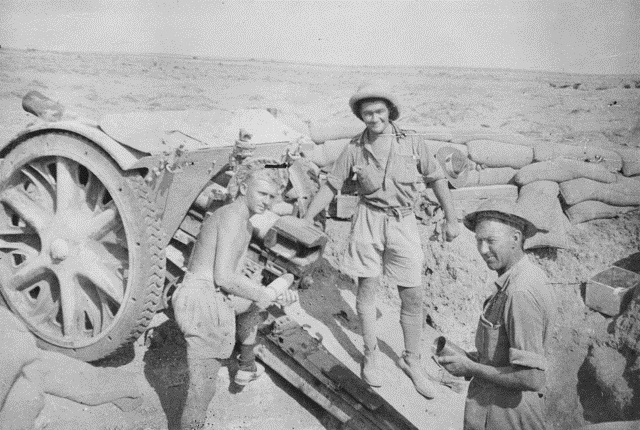
- Gunner Keith Corby (pictured middle) from the 2/12th man a captured Italian gun at Tobruk, 1941
- Active: 1940–46
- Country: Australia
- Type: Regiment
- Role: Artillery
- Size: 3 batteries ~ 700 personnel
- Part of: 9th Division
- Engagements: World War II: North Africa campaign; Syria–Lebanon Campaign; New Guinea Campaign; Borneo Campaign

Insignia
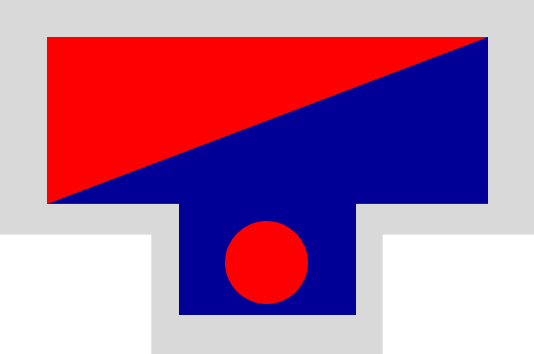
- Unit colour patch

The 2/12th Field Regiment was an Australian Army artillery regiment formed as part of the all volunteer Second Australian Imperial Force for overseas during World War II. Recruited in the state of Victoria in early 1940, the 2/12th was initially formed as a medium artillery regiment, but was later converted to a field regiment due to a lack of medium guns. As a field regiment, the 2/12th deployed to the Middle East where they supported the 9th Division in several battles during the North African Campaign in 1941–42, and undertook garrison duty in Lebanon. In early 1943, the regiment returned to Australia and subsequently fought in New Guinea, seeing action against the Japanese during the Huon Peninsula Campaign in 1943–44 and then the Borneo Campaign in 1945.

== History ==
Because of the Australian government's decision to raise a second infantry division – the 7th – as part of the all volunteer Second Australian Imperial Force (2nd AIF) there was a need to raise a corps headquarters element and supporting troops. Part of the corps' support requirements was a medium artillery unit and, as a result, in May 1940 the regiment was initially formed with the designation of the "2/2nd Medium Regiment". Under the command of Lieutenant Colonel Shirley Goodwin, the regiment was formed with a cadre of regular engineer and artillery personnel drawn from the coastal artillery units around Port Phillip Bay, as well as part-time artillerymen from the Victorian-based Militia 2nd Medium Brigade. It was intended that the regiment would be equipped with 60-pounder medium guns, and throughout their initial training the regiment's recruits were trained on weapons borrowed from Militia units; however, the weapons were scarce and in October 1940, because of the lack of appropriate guns, it was decided to convert the regiment into a field artillery unit. It was consequently redesignated as the "2/12th Field Regiment", and at the same time it was reallocated from I Australian Corps to the 9th Division, although it would not come under its control until it had moved to the Middle East in early 1941. Upon conversion to a field unit, the regiment's two batteries were redesignated: No. 3 became 23 Battery and No. 4 became 24 Battery.

No guns were received following its conversion to the field artillery establishment, as the regiment was to be equipped upon its arrival overseas, so training was undertaken at Puckapunyal using 18-pounders borrowed from the 2/8th Field Regiment. After completing training at Puckapunyal in mid-November, the regiment embarked upon the transport Stratheden and deployed to the Middle East, with a war establishment of just over 700 personnel. They arrived in Palestine in December 1940 and until March 1941, they were based at Qastina. That month, the regiment was reorganised into three batteries, each of two troops. The third battery was initially designated as 'Z' Battery, but it later came to be redesignated as 62 Battery.

The regiment subsequently undertook three major battles in the North African campaign, seeing action during the Siege of Tobruk and then the First and Second Battles of El Alamein. These were punctuated by a period of garrison duty in Lebanon between January and June 1942, where the regiment formed part of the occupation force established there after the defeat of Vichy French forces during the Syria-Lebanon Campaign, tasked with defending against a possible German attack over the Caucacus towards the strategically important Middle East oilfields. During the regiment's involvement in the fighting around Tobruk, it arrived at the port on HMAS Vampire in mid-May without any guns, and was allocated to the western sector, where they took over an assortment of British and captured Italian guns. This included several 60-pounders and 4.5-inch howitzers. According to The Mercury newspaper, during the siege the regiment "spent more days in action than any other Australian artillery unit". When they were finally relieved and evacuated from the besieged port – around September as part of the 24th Infantry Brigade – the regiment left its motley assortment of equipment to the British unit that replaced them – the 144th Field Regiment – and subsequently adopted the 144th's complete set of twenty-four 25-pounders and 36 tractors.

In January 1943, the regiment returned to Australia aboard the transport Ile de France as part of the final of the transference of Australian ground troops from the Middle East to the Pacific. After leave, the 2/12th re-formed at Kairi, on the Atherton Tablelands in Queensland in April 1943. A period of reorganisation and training followed as the 2/12th was prepared for the rigours of jungle warfare. In late July, they embarked by detachments at Cairns upon several transports including HMAS Manoora, Van Heutz, W Ellery Channing, USS Henry T Allen and the Van Der Lijn, bound for New Guinea where they were to join the fighting against the Japanese. After arriving at Milne Bay in August, they subsequently took part in landings around Lae and then Finschhafen in September, and saw action during the Huon Peninsula campaign. Supporting the 20th Infantry Brigade during the initial landing around Scarlet Beach, once Finschhafen was secured, the regiment's guns support the attack on Sattelberg from the coastal plain, before supporting further advances north as part of the drive towards Sio before returning to Australia in early 1944. After a year-long interlude training around Ravenshoe, Queensland, the regiment undertook its final campaign of the war in 1945, providing fire support during the Battle of North Borneo. Assigned to support the 24th Infantry Brigade, during the landing on Labuan two troops of the 2/12th came ashore alongside the assaulting infantry in LVTs, something the Australian Army had not done before. Later, during June, 14 guns from the regiment were moved by barge to support operations around Weston and Beaufort. The swampy ground in the area posed problems for the gunners, who had to shore up the ground with coconut palms. At the end of the war, the regiment was disbanded with its last war diary entry being made on 1 March 1946.

Throughout its existence, the regiment used a variety of guns including captured Italian pieces as well as Allied equipment. The British and American guns used by the regiment were: 60-pounder medium guns, 18-pounder field guns, 4.5-inch howitzers, 4.2-inch mortars, 25-pounders, and 75mm pack howitzers. Over 2,000 personnel served in the regiment during the six years it existed. Of these, a total of 71 members of the regiment were killed in action or died on active service, either from wounds sustained or as the result of an accident. A further 138 wounded are recorded on the regiment's casualty list. Members of the regiment received the following decorations: three Distinguished Service Orders, four Members of the Order of the British Empire, six Military Crosses, six Military Medals, and 44 Mentions in Despatches. A plaque commemorating the regiment's personnel is included in Anzac Square in Brisbane.

== Commanding officers ==
The following officers commanded the 2/12th Field Regiment:

- Lieutenant Colonel Shirley Thomas William Goodwin (1940–43);
- Lieutenant Colonel Geoffrey Dudderidge Houston (1943–45).
