= Kenneth Mackay (Australian general) =

Australian Army general (1917–2004)

- Mackay in Vietnam in 1966
- Born: 17 February 1917; Parkville, Victoria, Australia
- Died: 18 May 2004 (aged 87)
- Burial place: Millers Point, New South Wales, Australia
- Military career
- Allegiance: Australia
- Branch: Australian Army
- Service years: 1935–1974
- Rank: Major General
- Service number: NX12365
- Commands: Field Force Command; Eastern Command; 1st Division; Australian Force Vietnam; 3rd Battalion, Royal Australian Regiment; 67th Infantry Battalion
- Conflicts: Second World War; North African campaign; Second Battle of El Alamein; New Guinea campaign; Landing at Lae; Battle of Sattelberg; Battle of Wareo; Occupation of Japan; Korean War; Vietnam War
- Awards: Companion of the Order of the Bath; Member of the Order of the British Empire

Kenneth Mackay CB, MBE (17 February 1917 – 18 May 2004) was an Australian Army major general. He graduated from the Royal Military College, Duntroon, in 1938 and was commissioned as a lieutenant in the Artillery Branch of the Australian Staff Corps. During the Second World War, he served with the 9th Division (Australia) in the North African campaign and the New Guinea campaign. He later served in the Occupation of Japan, the Korean War and the Vietnam War, commanding the Australian Force Vietnam.

== Early life ==
Kenneth Mackay was born in Parkville, Victoria, on 17 February 1917, the son of Robert Mackay, a Commonwealth Audit Inspector. His father's work involved postings around Australia, and he attended schools in Darwin, Port Moresby, Wollongong and Melbourne, where he completed his secondary education at Melbourne High School.

In March 1935, Mackay entered the Royal Military College, Duntroon. He graduated on 14 December 1938 and was as commissioned as a lieutenant in the Artillery Branch of the Australian Staff Corps. His first posting was to the 1st Heavy Brigade, which was based at the North Head Fort in Sydney. During this assignment, he used a rope to rescue a seriously injured man from the base of the cliff below the fort, for which he was awarded the bronze medal of the Royal Humane Society. He graduated from the Field Artillery School in 1939.

== Second World War ==
Following the outbreak of the Second World War, Mackay joined the Second Australian Imperial Force (AIF) on 1 May 1940, and was given the AIF service number NX12365. He became the adjutant of the 2/8th Field Regiment, a Victorian and Tasmanian formation raised at Puckapunyal, Victoria. He was promoted to the temporary rank of captain on 8 July, which became substantive on 1 March. The 2/8th Field Regiment sailed for the Middle East in April 1941 and was assigned to the 9th Division. While the division was engaged in the Siege of Tobruk, Mackay's regiment was attached to the British 22nd Guards Brigade at Mersa Matruh. He served as a troop commander with the regiment's 16th Battery and commanded a battery of the Artillery Training Regiment at the Reinforcement Depot. He was assigned to the 9th Division headquarters as a liaison officer from 28 December 1941 to 14 June 1942.

Mackay went to Palestine, where he attended the British Army's Commando Instructors Course and the British Army Staff College at Haifa, which he attended from 15 June to 8 November 1942. While there, Mackay and another Australian officer saved two of the British instructors from drowning. On graduation, he returned to the 9th Division as the brigade major of the 26th Infantry Brigade, with the temporary rank of major from 13 November. He held this assignment during the Second Battle of El Alamein. The 9th Division returned to Australia in early 1943, and he married Judith Littler at St David's Cathedral, Hobart, on 6 March 1943. They had three children: Kenneth, Prudence and Euan. Later that year the 9th Division was deployed to New Guinea, where Mackay was the 26th Infantry Brigade's brigade major at the landing at Lae, the Battle of Sattelberg and the Battle of Wareo. For his service as a staff officer, he was made a Member of the Order of the British Empire (MBE).

Mackay was a GSO2 at Allied Land Forces Headquarters from 28 February to 13 September 1944. Following a request from the British Army for an officer "with experience working with British and American Forces and amphibious operations", he was assigned to the War Office in London as a GSO2. This allowed King George VI to present Mackay with his MBE insignia at Buckingham Palace on 11 May 1945. Mackay attended the Potsdam Conference in July 1945 as a member of Field Marshal Sir Alan Brooke's staff.

== Senior commands ==
After the war ended, Mackay became the secretary to the Joint Chiefs of Staff and Joint Planning Committee for the British Commonwealth Occupation Force (BCOF) that would participate in the occupation of Japan. Promoted to lieutenant colonel, he assumed command of the 67th Infantry Battalion at Kure in Japan in August 1948. The 67th Infantry Battalion became the 3rd Battalion, Australian Regiment, on 23 November 1948 and the 3rd Battalion, Royal Australian Regiment on 10 March 1949.

Mackay returned to Australia in August 1949 and was assigned to the Directorate of Military Operations and Plans at Army Headquarters in Melbourne as a staff officer. Apart from a brief tour of duty in Korea in 1952, he remained in the role until he became Chief Instructor of the School of Tactics and Administration at Seymour, Victoria. In 1955, he returned to the UK as a colonel and the Australian Assistant Defence Representative. Promoted to brigadier, he attended the Imperial Defence College. Returning to Australia, he was Director of Personnel, Maintenance, Quartering and Military Training at Army Headquarters in Melbourne and then Director of Military Operations and Plans at the new Army Headquarters in Canberra in December 1962.

When the Australian government decided to commit troops to the Vietnam War, Mackay was involved in the initial planning and then, with the rank of major general from 17 April 1966, became the first commander of Australian Force Vietnam. He remained in the role until 29 January 1967. He resisted American pressure to undertake more aggressive operations, preferring to concentrate Australian resources in Phước Tuy province on pacification, a role the Americans felt was better left to the South Vietnamese. For his service, he was appointed a Companion of the Order of the Bath on 30 January 1969.

Mackay returned to Australia, where he became commander of the 1st Division, then became the Quarter Master General. His final command was Eastern Command, based in Sydney, which became Field Force Command. He retired in 1974. In retirement he lived in Canberra, Port Macquarie and finally Sydney. He died on 18 May 2004. A military funeral was held at the Garrison Church, Sydney, on 27 May.
