= General Mackay =

General Mackay may refer to:

- Alexander Mackay (British Army officer) (1717–1789), British Army lieutenant general
- Andrew Mackay (British Army officer) (fl. 1980s–2000s), British Army major general
- Hugh Mackay (Scottish general) (c. 1640–1692), Dutch Scots Brigade lieutenant general
- Iven Mackay (1882–1966), Australian Army lieutenant general
- Kenneth Mackay (Australian politician) (1859–1935), Australian Army Reserve major general
- Kenneth Mackay (Australian general) (1917–2004), Australian general

== See also ==
- Iain Mackay-Dick (born 1945), British Army major general
