= Victoria, Labuan =

Capital of Labuan, Malaysia

Victoria Bandar Labuan
- Territorial capital
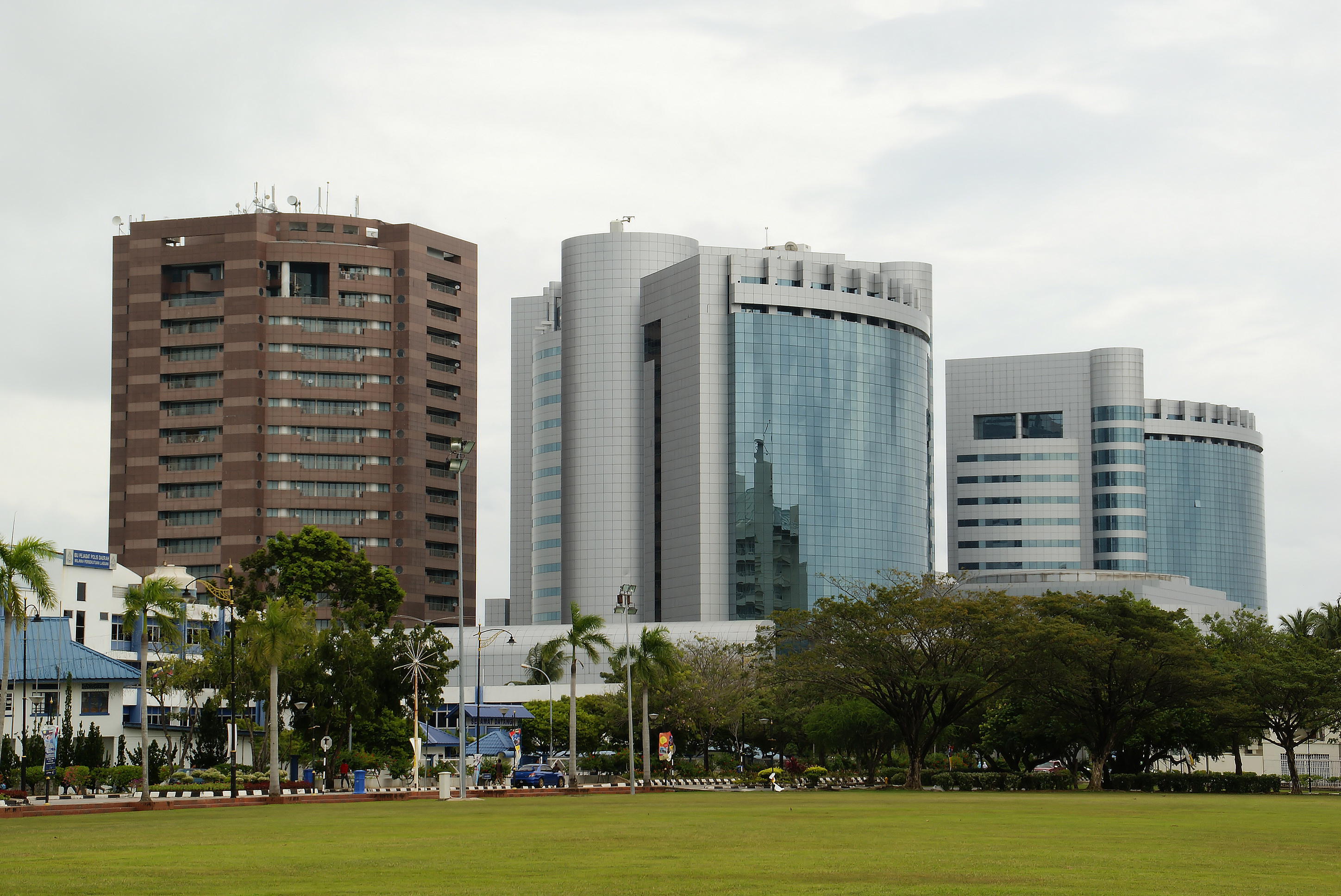
- Labuan Financial Park in Victoria, Labuan

- Location in Borneo
- Coordinates: 5°17′N 115°14′E
- Country: Malaysia
- Federal territory: Labuan
- Established: 1946

Population
  - Total: 97,500
- Time zone: UTC+8 (MST)
- Postcode: 87xxx
- Area code: 087

Victoria (Malaysian: [vikˈtɔriˈa]) (Malay: Bandar Victoria), sometimes known as Bandar Labuan or simply Labuan, is the capital of the Federal Territory of Labuan in Malaysia, an island group off the north coast of Borneo. It is in the southeast corner of Labuan and its Malay name, Bandar Victoria, is commonly used to honour the reign of Queen Victoria.

The town is an urban district within the wider city limits of Victoria which includes Labuan Port, a sheltered deep-water harbour which is an important trans-shipment point for Brunei Darussalam, northern Sarawak and western Sabah. The town’s political boundaries extend from Financial Park in the south to Kerupang in the north. The majority of commercial areas are situated in the southwest, with Financial Park located within older residential zones. The rest of region predominantly features older housing, with some affluent residences situated near the Labuan Golf Club. Unclaimed land and forested areas remain, particularly in the southern part of the school zone, which was formerly a small village. Forested and bushed areas present near Labuan Paragon (AZ Hotel & Serviced Apartment) and UTC (Labuan Central Market), which are currently undergoing deforestation, and additionally several forested and bushed areas scattered in the northeast of the Financial Park.

== Etymology ==
Victoria was named after Queen Victoria, who was the queen of the British Empire and British Malaya from 20 June 1837 to 22 January 1901.

== History ==
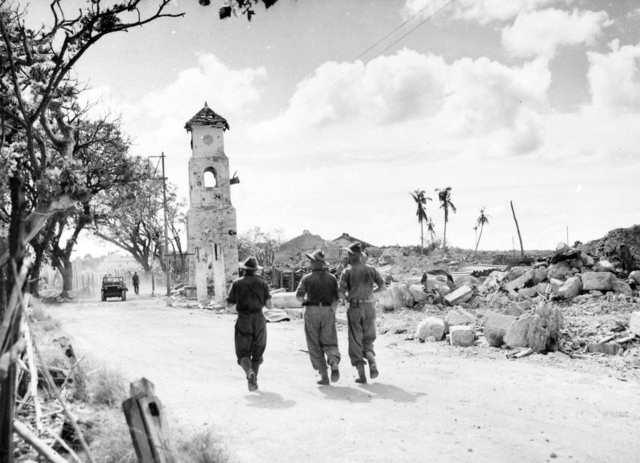
Soldiers from the Australian Army's 9th Division jog through the ruins of Victoria town hall and remains of the clock tower on 26 June 1945 after heavy bombing by Allied forces.

Since the 15th century, the town area including other parts of Labuan were under the Bruneian Empire. Its history dates back to the time when the island was ceded by Sultan Omar Ali Saifuddin II to the British. Rodney Mundy, a British naval officer, later visited the island in the name of Queen Victoria. The island was then occupied by Japan from 3 January 1942 until June 1945 and governed as part of the Northern Borneo military unit by the Japanese 37th Army. During the Battle of Labuan it was liberated by the 9th Division of Australian Imperial Force on 10 June 1945 and placed under a British Military Administration until 15 July 1946, when it was incorporated into the North Borneo Crown Colony. During this time, the Crown Colony government re-established much of the infrastructure that had been destroyed during the war. The island later became part of the state of Sabah and Malaysia in 1963 before the state government of Sabah ceded the island to the federal government in 1984. It was declared an international offshore financial centre and free trade zone in 1990 to assist the development of Victoria.

== Economy ==
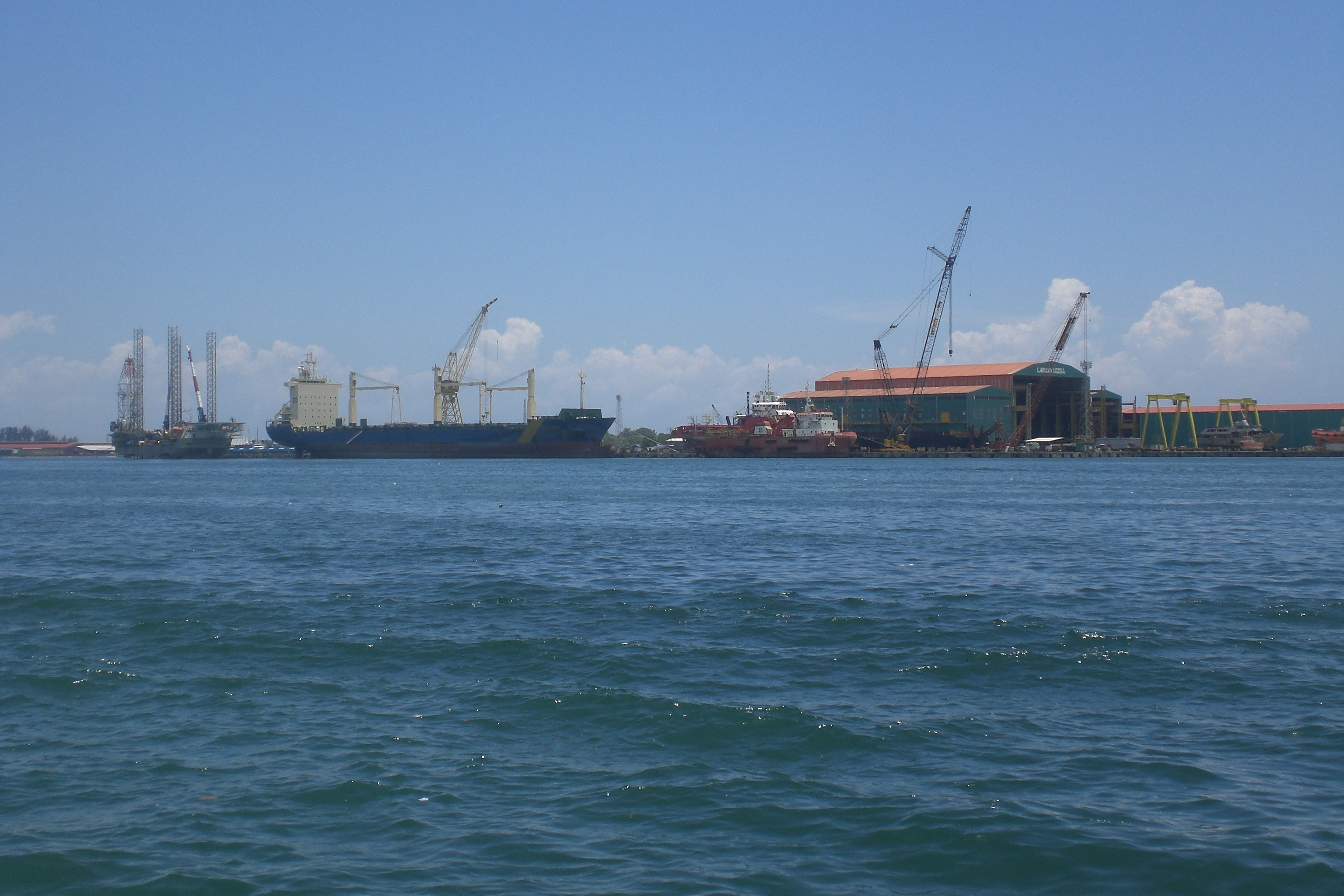
Labuan Port, an important area where economic activities for the island operated.

The major products produced on Labuan and exported through Labuan Port include copra, rubber and sago. The port is on a natural deep-water bay where large vessels can anchor as it is sheltered from typhoons. Vessels received include containers, bulk, and general cargoes. The main jetty is 244 metres long with an alongside depth of 8.5 metres and it can accommodate vessels to 16,000 DWT. The wharf has four berths. There are about 15,600 m² available in open storage, two warehouses and a container yard. A 10,000 m² yard and warehouses are available outside the port. Its capacity is 100,000 TEUs of containerised cargo per annum. Five private jetties are installed: the Shell Jetty that specialises in petroleum; the Iron Ore Jetty; the Methanol Jetty; and two offshore wheat and maize jetties called the Asian Supply Base Jetty and the Sabah Flour Mill Jetty.

Victoria's Financial Park along Jalan Merdeka houses offshore teams of international banks, insurance and trust companies. Victoria is an offshore support hub for deepwater oil and gas activities in the region. In 2025, Victoria had a population of over 97,500 with nearly half of those coming from elsewhere in Malaysia and from Brunei Darussalam. It has a 1,500-seat convention hall adjoining a large shopping mall; these form a modern complex which enhances Victoria's status among International Offshore Financial Centres.

== Climate ==
Victoria, Labuan features a tropical rainforest climate (Af), which is true for virtually all of Malaysia due to its close proximity to the equator, with constantly high temperatures and abundant rainfall over the course of the year. Like all cities and town with this climate, there is no dry season and the temperature in the city averages 27.8 °C (82.0 °F), while the average annual rainfall is 3,413 millimetres (134.4 in).

Climate data for Victoria
Month	Jan	Feb	Mar	Apr	May	Jun	Jul	Aug	Sep	Oct	Nov	Dec	Year
Mean daily maximum °C (°F)	30.0 (86.0)	30.0 (86.0)	30.9 (87.6)	31.6 (88.9)	31.6 (88.9)	31.4 (88.5)	31.1 (88.0)	31.0 (87.8)	31.0 (87.8)	30.6 (87.1)	30.4 (86.7)	30.3 (86.5)	30.8 (87.5)
Daily mean °C (°F)	27.3 (81.1)	27.3 (81.1)	27.8 (82.0)	28.3 (82.9)	28.4 (83.1)	28.3 (82.9)	27.9 (82.2)	27.9 (82.2)	27.8 (82.0)	27.5 (81.5)	27.4 (81.3)	27.4 (81.3)	27.8 (82.0)
Mean daily minimum °C (°F)	24.6 (76.3)	24.6 (76.3)	24.8 (76.6)	25.1 (77.2)	25.3 (77.5)	25.2 (77.4)	24.8 (76.6)	24.8 (76.6)	24.6 (76.3)	24.5 (76.1)	24.5 (76.1)	24.6 (76.3)	24.8 (76.6)
Average precipitation mm (inches)	257 (10.1)	123 (4.8)	166 (6.5)	217 (8.5)	308 (12.1)	275 (10.8)	285 (11.2)	314 (12.4)	376 (14.8)	387 (15.2)	401 (15.8)	304 (12.0)	3,413 (134.2)
Source: Climate-Data.org

== International relations ==
=== Sister city ===
Victoria currently has one sister city:

- Xianning, China
