= Ar Rajma =

Ar Rajma الرجمة Er Regima
- Village
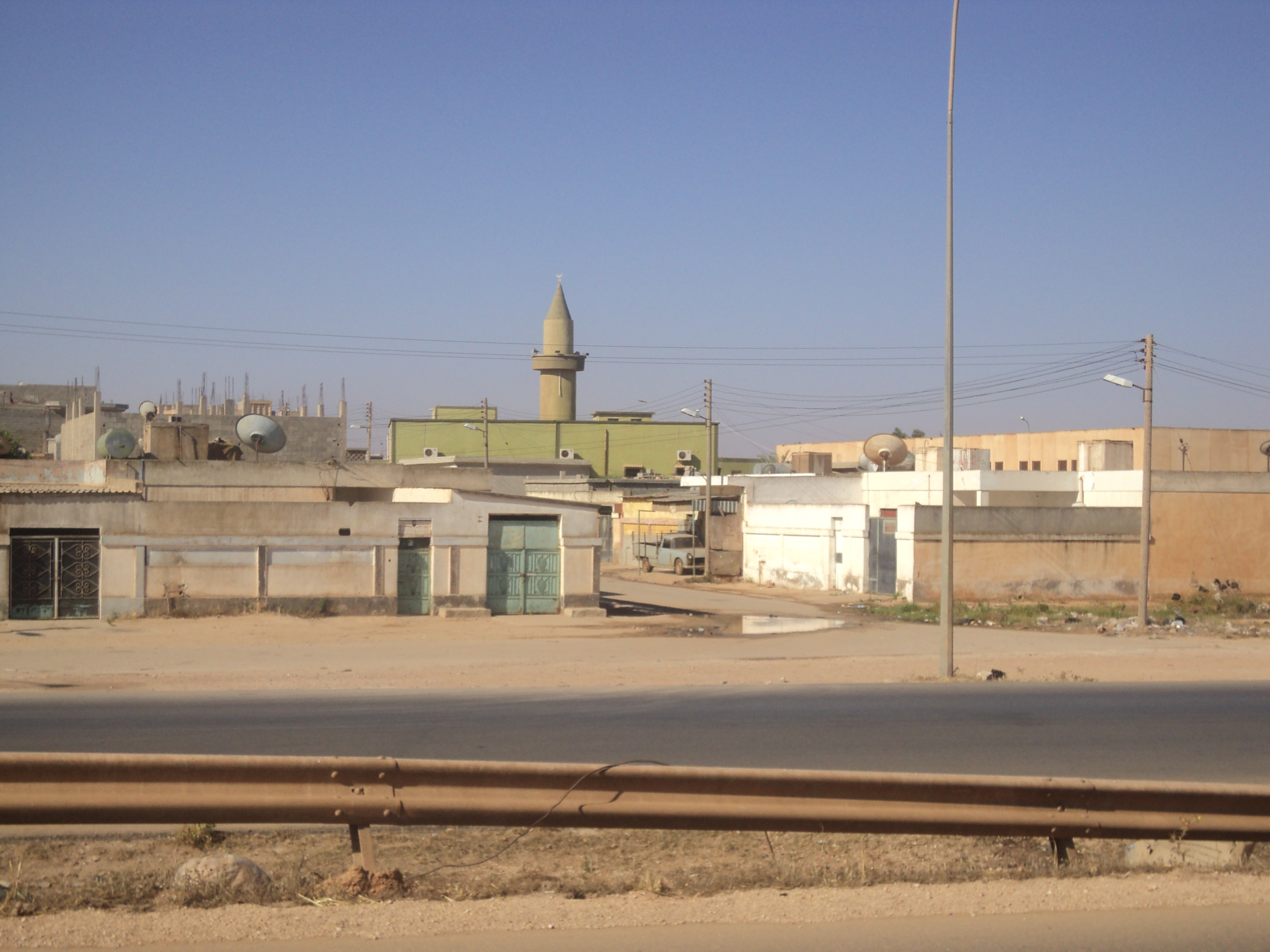

- Location in Libya
- Coordinates: 32°4′18″N 20°20′26″E
- Country: Libya
- Region: Cyrenaica
- District: Marj

Population (2006)
  - Total: 3,220
- Time zone: UTC+2 (EET)

Ar Rajma, Er Rajma, or Er Regima is a village in eastern Libya. It is located 27 km (17 mi) east of Benghazi.

Ar Rajma escarpment, the closest of Jebel Akhdar's escarpments to Benghazi, was named after this village.

It is the current headquarters of the Libyan National Army (LNA).
