= No. 93 Squadron RAAF =

Royal Australian Air Force squadron

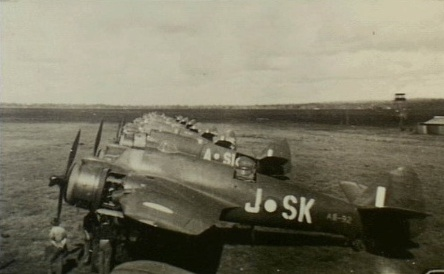
- No. 93 Squadron Beaufighter aircraft at Kingaroy, Queensland, in 1945
- Active: 1945–1946
- Country: Australia
- Branch: Royal Australian Air Force
- Type: Heavy fighter
- Part of: No. 86 Wing
- Nickname(s): "Green Ghost Squadron"
- Motto(s): Spookus Sneakinus (unofficial)
- Engagements: Borneo Campaign

Insignia
- Squadron code: SK

Aircraft flown
- Fighter: Beaufighter

No. 93 Squadron was a Royal Australian Air Force fighter squadron that operated during World War II. It was formed in January 1945 and disbanded in August 1946. Due to delays in bringing operational airfields into service, the squadron saw little combat before the end of the war.

== Squadron history ==
No. 93 Squadron was formed at Kingaroy, Queensland, on 22 January 1945. It was equipped with Bristol Beaufighters, and received its first aircraft in January. The squadron conducted training throughout February, March and April with a focus on gunnery and rocket practice. On 5 March three No. 93 Squadron Beaufighters departed from Oakey to escort No. 79 Squadron Spitfires to Morotai.

The squadron left Australia in May to take part in the Borneo Campaign. The advance echelon embarked on ships bound for Morotai on 11 May and arrived there on the 22nd of that month. A further echelon embarked for Labuan on 5 June. While No. 93 Squadron's ground party was established at Labuan shortly after 13 June, the aircraft could not be brought forward due to either the intermediate landing ground at Tarakan being unserviceable or Labuan's airstrip needing to be extended. As a result, while No. 93 Squadron was originally intended to be operational at Labuan from 25 July as part of No. 86 Wing, its first two aircraft did not arrive there until 23 July. The remainder of the squadron departed from Kingaroy on 31 July and arrived at Labuan on 5 August.

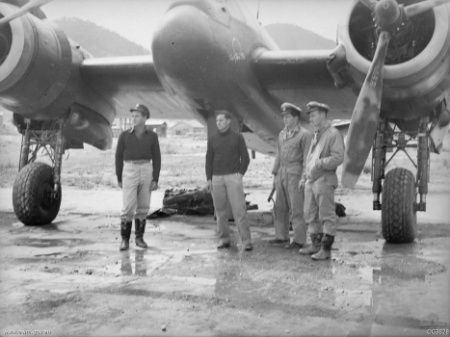
The crews of the first two No. 93 Squadron Beaufighters to arrive at Bofu, Japan after escorting P-51 Mustang fighters

No. 93 Squadron saw only limited combat before the end of the war. The first aircraft to arrive at Labuan began flying combat sorties on 26 July in conjunction with No. 1 Squadron. On 7 August, eight Beaufighters attacked and sank what was believed to be an 800-ton oil tanker in the Tabuan River. It was later determined that the ship was the Rajah of Sarawak's private yacht. One aircraft was lost in this attack, but its crew bailed out and made contact with the 9th Division on 20 August after being assisted by civilians. The squadron flew its last combat missions on 13 August, when four aircraft made an armed reconnaissance of Kuching aerodrome and another eight attacked Tromboul Airfield.

The squadron conducted some further flying after the end of the war. It dropped leaflets announcing the Japanese surrender over Japanese-held areas until 9 September and conducted a show of force over Kuching on 11 September. On 15 September, a No. 93 Squadron Beaufighter flew a film of the Japanese surrender at Singapore to RAAF Base Laverton and on 25 September the squadron was requested to destroy United States military barges with rockets. It also provided navigation escorts to single-engined RAAF fighters returning to Australia. The squadron's operation room was closed on 21 October but weather reconnaissance flights continued. The squadron's commanding officer was killed in an accident on 10 December.

The First Tactical Air Force advised No. 93 Squadron that it was to be reduced to an air echelon and nucleus party on 20 December. Its personnel and ground equipment departed from Labuan bound for Narromine, New South Wales, and arrived there on 23 December. Meanwhile, No. 93 Squadron's aircraft were used to escort No. 81 Wing's Mustang fighters to Japan where they were to form part of the British Commonwealth Occupation Force. The squadron's aircraft returned to Australia when these flights were completed in mid-March 1946. The squadron's last flight took place on 14 May and it was disbanded on 22 August 1946.
