= Timbalai Airfield =

Coordinates: 5.300833°N 115.250278°E

- IATA: none; ICAO: none

Summary
- Location: Labuan, Malaysia
- Opened: 1945
- Built: 1942
- In use: 1942 - 1945
- Interactive map of Timbalai Airfield

Timbalai Airfield was an airfield located on the western coast of Labuan, Malaysia.

The airfield was built by the Imperial Japanese after occupying Labuan Island. The Japanese airfield was later made unserviceable from Allied bombing raids. During early June 1945, the airfield was captured by the Australian Army.

As of 2015, the airfield was still in use.

== Allied Units Based at Timbalai Airfield ==
- 13th Wireless Section (Heavy) "A" Corps Signals
