= 2/8th Field Regiment (Australia) =

Australian Army artillery unit

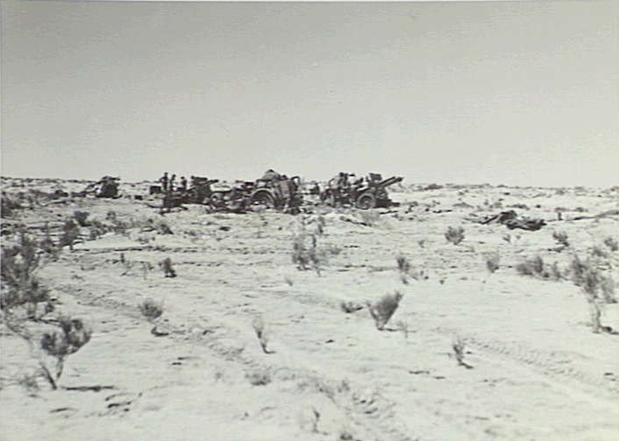
- Guns of the 2/8th firing during the fighting at El Alamein, July 1942
- Active: 1940–46
- Country: Australia
- Branch: Army
- Type: Regiment
- Role: Artillery
- Size: 3 batteries
- Part of: 9th Division
- Engagements: World War II: North African campaign; Borneo campaign

Insignia
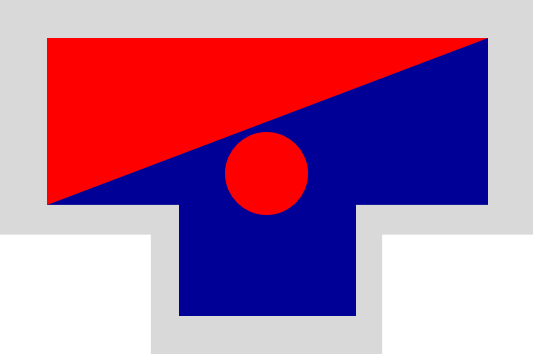
- Unit colour patch

The 2/8th Field Regiment was an Australian Army field artillery regiment that was raised for service during the Second World War as part of the all-volunteer Second Australian Imperial Force. Composed mainly of soldiers from the states of Victoria and Tasmania, the regiment was one of three field artillery regiments that were assigned to the Australian 9th Division during the war, and during its war service it saw action in North Africa in 1941–42, being heavily involved in the First and Second Battles of El Alamein between July and November 1942 before returning to Australian in 1943, as the Australian government rebalanced its land forces to face the threat in the Pacific. Nevertheless, the regiment did not see action again until mid-1945 when it was committed to the brief Borneo campaign. It was disbanded in early 1946 at the conclusion of hostilities.

== History ==
Established in May 1940 at Puckapunyal, Victoria, the 2/8th Field Regiment was assigned to the Australian 9th Division. Its first commanding officer was Lieutenant Colonel Alan Crisp. It initially consisted of two batteries from Victorian and Tasmanian volunteers – designated the 15th and 16th – although a third, the 58th, was raised in October 1941. Later in the war, the regiment's composition would change as reinforcements would be sourced from all Australian states. After the initial formation of the two batteries in their home locations, it took some time for the regiment to concentrate, and it was not until November 1940, that the 15th and 16th Batteries came together concentrated at Puckapunyal, Victoria. Guns were short initially, the regiment was only able to conduct one live shoot before deploying, using borrowed weapons. Embarking upon the transport Strathmore at Port Melbourne and sailing for the Middle East. Travelling via Fremantle and crossing the Indian Ocean, they reached Palestine in the middle of December 1940.

After training on 18-pounders and 4.5 howitzers, the regiment was equipped with 25-pound artillery pieces in early 1941. During the 9th Division's early involvement in the fighting in North Africa, the 2/8th was used to defend Mersa Matruh – a strategically important railhead on the Egyptian coast, lying between the ports of Tobruk and Alexandria – between May and September 1941, before moving to Sidi Barrani. In October 1941, they were moved to Palestine, before being sent to Syria in January 1942 to join the Allied garrison that had been established their following the defeat of the Vichy French forces there during the Syria–Lebanon Campaign. They remained there, establishing a position around Jdaidet on the Syria–Lebanon border to defend against a possible German invasion, until July 1942 when the 9th Division was hurriedly transferred to El Alamein, after the fall of Tobruk. By this time the regiment was commanded by Lieutenant Colonel Walter Tinsley. The regiment subsequently took part in both the First and Second Battles of El Alamein between July and November, firing over 163,000 shells, mainly in support of the 26th Brigade.

In January 1943, the 2/8th was withdrawn to Australia as the 9th Division was brought back to join the fight against Japanese forces in the Pacific. The regiment, sailing aboard the Dutch transport, Nieu Amsterdam, made landfall at Melbourne on 24 February 1943. The regiment was based at Seymour, Victoria, while personnel went on leave, but in April the 2/8th Field Regiment relocated to the Atherton Tablelands in Queensland. While the rest of the 9th Division was subsequently employed in New Guinea in landings around Lae and in the fighting on the Huon Peninsula, the 2/8th was not deployed as the 9th Division's artillery complement was reduced as part of its conversion to the jungle divisional establishment. As a result, the 2/8th did not see action again until late in the war, when they took part in the Borneo campaign in June 1945.

In May 1945, the regiment sailed from Australia to Morotai Island, where the Allies had established a large base as a staging area for Operation Oboe, where they received new equipment including 75 mm howitzers, which were to complement their 25-pounders. After a brief period of preparation, the regiment joined the amphibious invasion of North Borneo. The regiment's guns came ashore around Brooketon, in Brunei Bay, and Lutong, aboard US landing vehicles where the surf allowed. For the remainder of the campaign, they fired mainly in support of the 20th Brigade. After the conclusion of hostilities in August 1945, the regiment was slowly disbanded, with a number of the regiment's personnel being transferred to the 2/4th Pioneer Battalion to undertake garrison duties around Kuching in November 1945. In December, the remainder of the 2/8th's personnel returned to Australia and on 30 January 1946 it was disbanded. A total of 34 members of the regiment were killed or died on active service during the war.

== Commanding officers ==
The 2/8th Field Regiment was commanded by the following officers:

- Lieutenant Colonel Alan Percy;
- Lieutenant Colonel Walter Tinsley; and
- Lieutenant Colonel Roy Johnston.
