= 9th Division (Australia) =

WW2 Australian Army formation

9th Australian Division
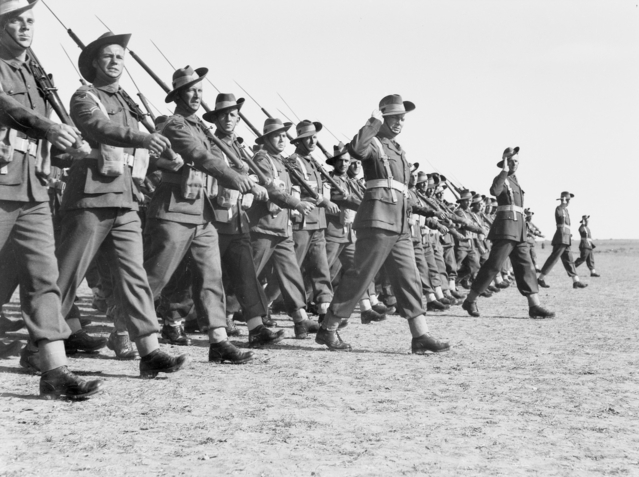
- Members of the 9th Division parade at Gaza Airport in late 1942
- Active: 1940–1946
- Country: Australia
- Branch: Second Australian Imperial Force
- Type: Infantry
- Size: ~16,000–18,000 personnel.
- Nicknames: "The Rats of Tobruk"; "The Magnificent 9th"
- Engagements: World War II: Siege of Tobruk; First Battle of El Alamein; Second Battle of El Alamein; New Guinea campaign; Borneo campaign (1945)

Commanders
- Notable commanders: Sir Leslie Morshead; George Wootten

Insignia
- First pattern 1940–1942

- Second pattern 1942–1946

The 9th Division was a division of the Australian Army that served during World War II. It was the fourth division raised for the Second Australian Imperial Force (2nd AIF). The distinctions of the division include it being:

- in front line combat longer, cumulatively, than any other Australian division;
- one of the Australian military's most decorated formations;
- the only 2nd AIF division formed in the United Kingdom, from infantry brigades and support units formed in Australia;
- praised by both Allied and Axis generals, including Bernard Montgomery and Erwin Rommel, as well as non-Australian military historians, and;
- like the 6th and 7th Divisions, being one of only a few Allied army units to serve in both the Mediterranean and Pacific theatres.

During 1940, the component units of the 9th Division were sent to the UK to defend it against a possible German invasion. After serving during 1941–1942 in the North African campaign, at the Siege of Tobruk and both the First and Second Battles of El Alamein, the 9th Division returned to Australia. In 1943–1944, it served in the New Guinea campaign and, during 1945, in the Borneo campaign. It was disbanded, following the end of the war, in early 1946.

== History ==
=== Formation ===
The 9th Division was the fourth AIF division raised, being formed in the United Kingdom in late 1940. Initially it consisted of only two infantry brigades which had been formed in Australia and dispatched to Britain in order to defend against a possible invasion following the Fall of France—the 18th and 25th Brigades—under the command of Major General Henry Wynter. Later, the 24th Brigade was also assigned to the division.

In January 1941 Wynter became ill and was replaced as divisional commander by Leslie Morshead. By February 1941, 9th Division headquarters had been relocated to the Middle East. Around this time the divisions of the AIF underwent a reorganisation as the decision was made to send the more established brigades to Greece; as a result both the 18th and 25th Brigades were transferred from the 9th to the 7th Division. They were replaced by the 20th and 26th Brigades, both of which were considered to be less experienced and therefore less ready for action.

=== North Africa ===
==== Cyrenaica ====
After completing its initial training in Australia, Great Britain and Palestine, the units of the 9th Division were sent to Cyrenaica in Libya in early March 1941 to complete their training and equipping as part of the garrison of this region. Short of equipment such as machine guns, mortars, anti-tank guns and carriers, most of the division's artillery and cavalry units did not accompany the infantry brigades to Cyrenaica at this time. The 20th Brigade was the first unit from the division to move, departing on 27 February. It was joined shortly by the other two brigades. It was during this time that the division suffered its first casualties when German bombers attacked the transport column in which the 2/13th Battalion was travelling, killing two Australians and wounding one other. By 9 March the 20th Brigade relieved the 17th Brigade from the 6th Division, along the Cyrenaican frontier.

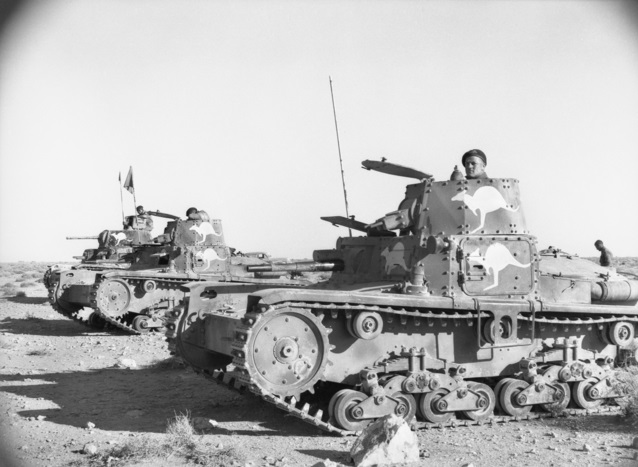
Australian troops using captured Italian tanks

By late March, it became clear that German-led Axis forces planned to launch an offensive in Cyrenaica. As a result, the 9th Division commander, Leslie Morshead, ordered the 20th Brigade to withdraw from the frontier, moving 160 miles (260 km) back towards Benghazi. The offensive began on 24 March, quickly forcing the British units along the frontier back as it drove towards Benghazi. Two days later the 26th Brigade took up positions in the west near the coast to support the 20th Brigade which was holding the pass at Er Regima. At this stage, the division's anti-tank troops were issued with captured Italian guns in order to make up the shortfall in British weapons.

As the Axis advance continued with German victories at Marsa Brega and Agedabia which threatened to outflank the units cut off in Benghazi, the 9th Division were ordered to fall back from their positions along the coast to the east to Derna. Lacking their own transport, they had to rely on that provided by other units and thus the withdrawal had to be undertaken in stages. In order to achieve this, the 2/13th Battalion was used as a rear guard and late in the afternoon of 4 April it undertook the division's first action of the war when the Germans attacked their positions in the Er Regima Pass. Supported by British artillery, the battalion, spread out across an 11-kilometre (6.8 mi) front, managed to delay a German force of about 3,000 personnel mounted in lorries and accompanied by armoured cars and tanks. Only lightly armed, however, they were unable to prevent the Germans from outflanking them, and gradually they were forced to pull back before. At 2200 hours, their transport arrived, and they were able to withdraw just as they were faced with encirclement. In this action, the 2/13th Battalion suffered five killed and 93 wounded or captured.

Two days after the action at Er Regima Pass, the 9th Division was ordered to fall back along the coast road towards Tobruk in what was later called the "Benghazi Handicap". Due to the speed of the Axis advance and the division's lack of transport, confusion reigned and part of the 2/15th Battalion, including most of its headquarters and its commanding officer, were captured.

==== Siege of Tobruk ====
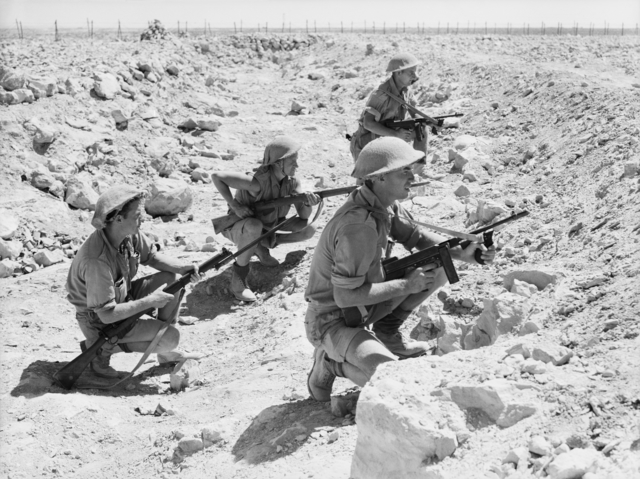
A patrol from the 2/13th Infantry Battalion at Tobruk (AWM 020779)

Covered by rear guard actions at Er Regima and Mechili, the 9th Division reached Tobruk on 9 April 1941. The 7th Division's 18th Brigade had arrived two days earlier and together with a number of British artillery and armoured regiments and an Indian cavalry regiment, the 18th King Edward's Own Cavalry (now 18 Cavalry), they were placed under the command of Major General John Lavarack and ordered to hold the port for at least two months while a relieving force from Egypt was organised.

The first engagement came on 10 April when an Axis force approached the port from the west but was repelled. The following day, Tobruk was effectively placed under siege when German forces cut the supply road to its east, encircling the Allied garrison. On 13 April the first major attack came when the German commander, Erwin Rommel, launched an attack against the 20th Brigade west of the El Adem road. This attack was beaten off, although that night a force of Germans with mortars and machine guns managed to break into the defences only to be counterattacked by a small group of Australians, including John Edmondson, armed with bayonets and grenades. For his part in the attack Edmondson was posthumously awarded the Victoria Cross, the first of seven which were bestowed upon members of the 9th Division during the war.

Over the course of the next six months the 9th Division and the rest of the garrison repelled repeated attempts by Rommel's forces to capture the port. The Australian defence of Tobruk was anchored on three factors: the use of the pre-existing Italian fortifications around the port, aggressive patrolling and raiding of Axis positions and the firepower of the garrison's artillery. Fighting from fixed positions, the Australian infantry successfully contained and defeated repeated German armoured and infantry attacks on the fortress. After the failure of the British attempts to relieve the fortress in May and June 1941 the 9th Division was successful in gradually improving Tobruk's defences through aggressively raiding Axis positions.

Upon the request of the Australian War Cabinet, the bulk of the 9th Division was withdrawn from Tobruk in September and October 1941, and handed over to the British 70th Division with only the 2/13th Battalion remaining in the fortress at the time the garrison was finally relieved in December. The defence of Tobruk cost the 9th Division 3,164 casualties including 650 killed, 1,597 wounded and 917 captured.

==== El Alamein ====
Syrian interlude

After its withdrawal from Tobruk the 9th Division enjoyed only a brief period of rest in Palestine before being redeployed to northern Syria where, as part of the British Ninth Army, it was responsible for guarding the Turkish–Syrian frontier. Here they were rejoined by the 9th Division Cavalry Regiment, which had been detached in June 1941 to take part in the Syria–Lebanon campaign. This deployment was the first time all the elements of the division had been concentrated in one area, albeit an area that stretched 1,200 square miles (3,100 km^{2}). In addition to its garrison duties, the 9th Division also conducted some much needed training in mobile warfare during its stay in Syria.

In early 1942 Australian I Corps, including the 6th and 7th Divisions, was withdrawn to Australia in response to Japan's entry into the war. The Australian government, however, agreed to British requests to retain the 9th Division in the Middle East in exchange for an additional American division being sent to Australia.

First Battle of El Alamein

During early 1942 the Axis forces advanced steadily through north west Egypt. It was decided that the British Eighth Army should make a stand just over 100 kilometres (62 mi) west of Alexandria, at the railway siding of El Alamein, where the coastal plain narrowed between the Mediterranean Sea and the inhospitable Qattara Depression. On 26 June 1942 the 9th Division was ordered to begin moving from northern Syria to El Alamein. On 1 July, Rommel's forces made a major attack, hoping to dislodge the Allies from the area, take Alexandria, and open the way to Cairo and the Suez Canal. However, the Eighth Army had regrouped sufficiently to repel the Axis forces and launch counterattacks. On 6 July, the lead elements of the 9th Division arrived at Tel el Shammama 22 miles (35 km) from the front, from where they would be committed to the fighting in the northern sector.

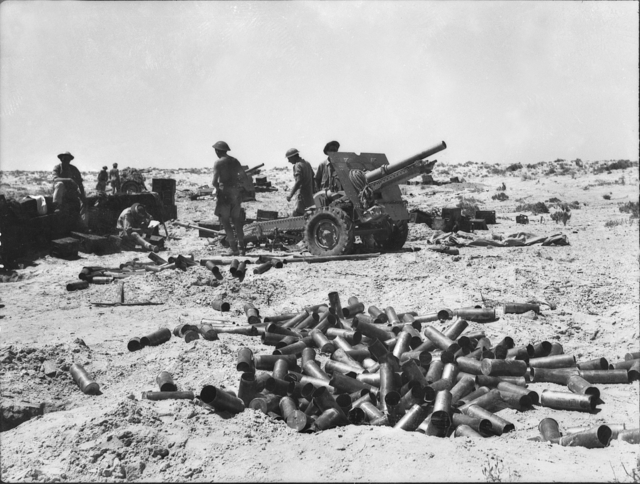
Guns of the 2/8th Field Regiment at El Alamein in July 1942 (AWM 024515)

Before dawn on 10 July, as Rommel focused his efforts on the southern flank of the battlefield, the 9th Division attacked the north flank of the enemy positions and captured the strategic high ground around Tel el Eisa. The 26th Brigade took more than 1,500 prisoners of war. Possibly the most important feature of the battle, however, was that the 2/24 had captured Signals Intercept Company 621, which had been providing Rommel with priceless intelligence from British radio communications. In the days following, Rommel redirected his forces against them, in a series of intense counterattacks, but was unable to dislodge the Australians. On 22 July, the 24th and 26th Brigades attacked German positions on the ridges south of Tel el Esia, suffering heavy casualties taking positions on Tel el Eisa Ridge and Makh Khad Ridge.

The final phase of the First Battle of El Alamein was a disaster for the Allies and the 2/28th Battalion in particular: an attempt to capture Sanyet el Miteiriya, known as "Ruin Ridge", on 27 July. The operation was part of a complex series of night attacks. The 2/28th suffered significant casualties and vehicle losses in its advance, but achieved its objective. However, the battalion was soon surrounded by German infantry. A planned advance by British tanks failed and German tanks arrived. The 2/28th's positions came under a prolonged and methodical attack by the Axis forces. By the time they surrendered, 65 Australians had been killed. Although the vast majority of the 2/28th had become prisoners of war, 93 members of the battalion remained behind Allied lines and it was subsequently rebuilt.

Second Battle of El Alamein

Following the fighting in July, the 9th Division remained in front-line positions around El Alamein, but were engaged in mainly static defensive duties for the next three months. Nevertheless, patrols were maintained and some raiding was undertaken, including a raid on 1 September undertaken by the 2/15th Battalion to seize a point 3 kilometres (1.9 mi) south-west of Tel el Eisa in which 150 Germans were killed and another 140 taken prisoner, against which the Australians lost 39 killed, 109 wounded and another 25 missing.

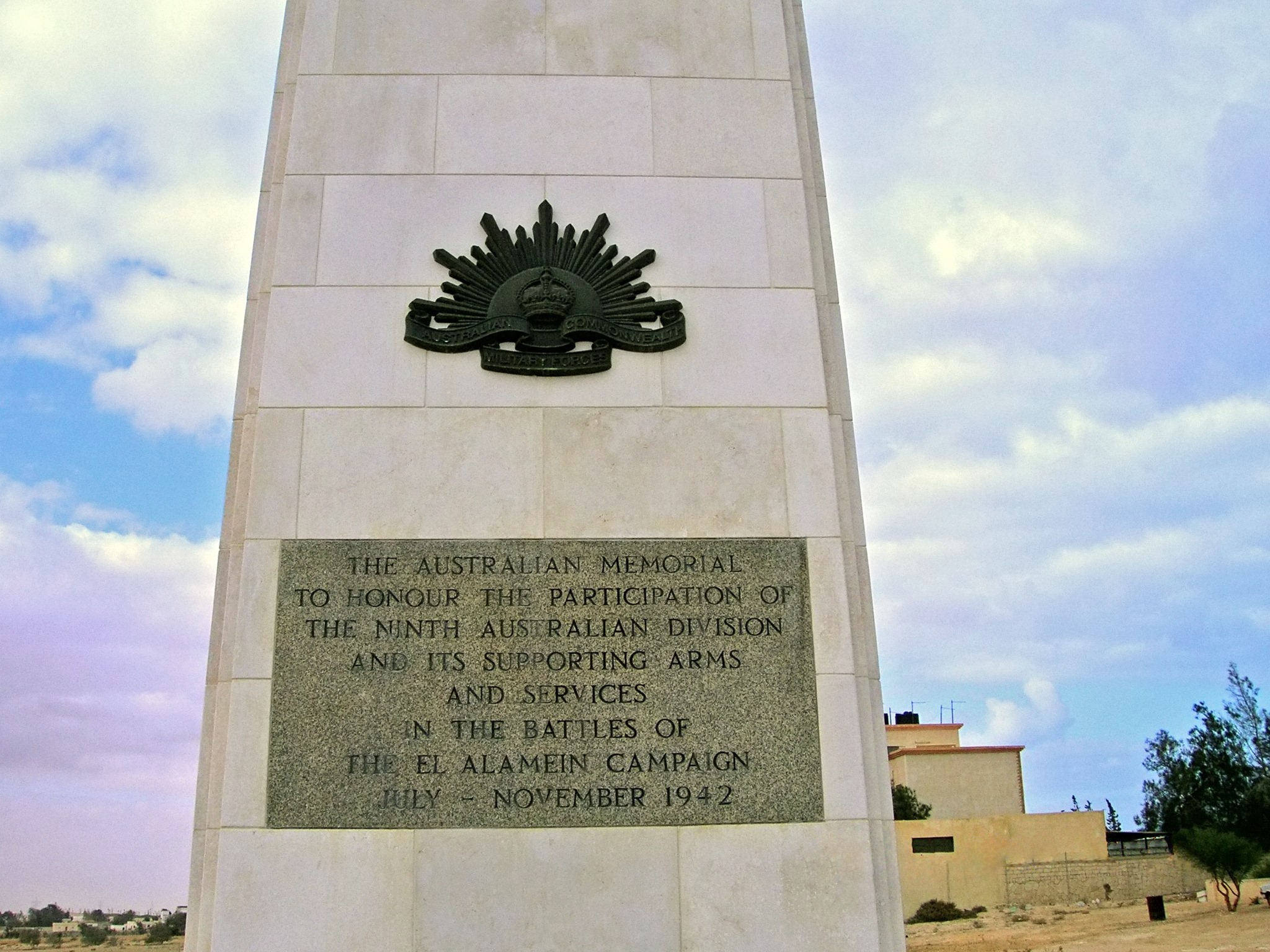
Memorial to the 9th Division at the Allied Cemetery at El Alamein

By late October 1942, the Eighth Army, now commanded by Lieutenant-General Bernard Montgomery, decided to launch its own offensive in the Western Desert, amassing a force of some 220,000 personnel supported by 1,100 tanks and 900 artillery pieces. The 9th Division was positioned in the northern sector of the Eighth Army's front at El Alamein, nearest the coast, as part of British XXX Corps. This sector was to effect the main thrust of the Allied attack. While XIII and most of XXX Corps failed to meet their objectives on 25 October, the 9th Division gained considerable momentum, attacking both frontally and executing a wide "left hook" from their original positions, in their sector, with one Axis outpost after another falling to them. Together with the 51st (Highland) Division, and the 2nd New Zealand Division, they had mauled the Italian Trento Division and the German 164th Division. By the following day the 9th Division had managed to further slice through the German 164th Division and trap the greater part of it against the sea. This caused the Axis to rush reinforcements to their sector.

As events unfolded, it was on the 9th that Montgomery, the Eighth Army commander, pinned his hopes on a breakthrough. Before this breakthrough was attempted, however, the 9th Division was subjected to numerous counter-attacks by German forces and many of the division's units suffered so many casualties that they were described as "mere skeletons". By the night of 31 October/1 November Morshead decided to relieve his forward brigade, the 26th Brigade, with the relatively fresh 24th Brigade, however, the following day two German divisions attacked the brigade.

On 2 November, Operation Supercharge—as the breakout was named—began and the final phase of the battle began. The British armoured formations suffered heavily in the initial stages, before on the second day the 51st Division managed to force a gap through the Axis lines, creating a gap of over 6 miles (9.7 km) through which the armour was redirected. The result of this was that the pressure was taken off the 9th Division as the focus of the fighting shifted to the south of Tel el Eisa. After this the 9th Division ceased offensive action, although they continued patrolling operations until 4 November when Rommel ordered a general withdrawal. The four months that the 9th Division had been involved in the fighting around El Alamein cost them 1,225 killed, 3,638 wounded and 946 captured, for a total of 5,809 casualties.

=== South West Pacific ===
In October 1942 the Australian government requested that the 9th Division be released from service in the Middle East and returned to Australia to be utilised against the Japanese in the Pacific. Although both the British prime minister, Winston Churchill and the American president Franklin Roosevelt advised against this, the Australian prime minister John Curtin insisted and by mid December the decision to bring the division back to Australia was confirmed. In late December the division concentrated around Gaza, where a divisional parade was held before preparations for embarkation began.

The 9th Division began embarking for its return to Australia on 24 January 1943. Transported on four troopships—the Queen Mary, Ile de France, Nieuw Amsterdam and Aquitania—as part of Operation Pamphlet the division arrived at Fremantle in Western Australia on 18 February whereupon all members of the division were granted three weeks leave. Welcome-home parades were held in every Australian capital city, after which the 9th Division began reforming in April 1943 in the semi-tropical Atherton Tablelands region of Far North Queensland where it began re-organising and re-training for jungle warfare. As part of the conversion to a Jungle Division many of the division's units were either separated from the division, reorganised into new roles or disbanded. Of note, the division's cavalry unit, the 9th Division Cavalry Regiment, gave up its vehicles and was converted to the commando role, becoming the 2/9th Cavalry Commando Regiment. After completing amphibious training near Cairns the 9th Division, now under Major General George Wootten who had taken command of the division in March, departed for Milne Bay in New Guinea in late July and early August 1943.

==== New Guinea ====
Lae

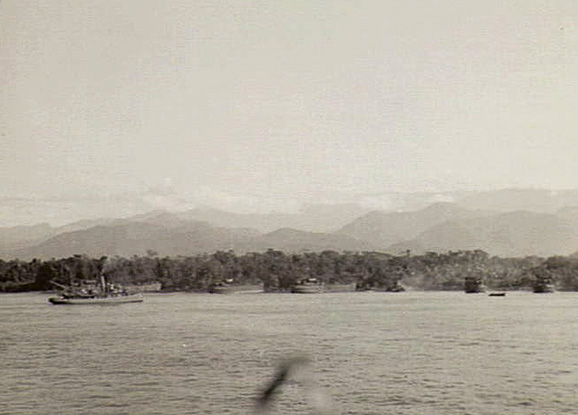
The 9th Division makes its amphibious landing east of Lae, September 1943.

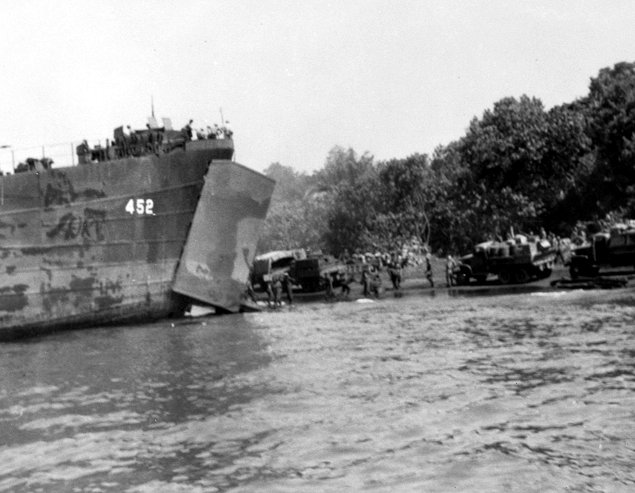
Part of the 9th Australian Division, under the command of Major-General G.F. Wooten landing at Lae, New Guinea, 4 September 1943. LST-452 and other LSTs are unloading troops and equipment.

The 9th Division's first task in New Guinea was to liberate the town of Lae in a joint operation with the 7th Division. The 9th Division would carry out an amphibious landing to the east of the town at Malahang—the first large scale seaborne landing by an Australian formation since the Gallipoli campaign in 1915—while the 7th Division would be flown into the recently secured Nadzab airfield, to the west of Lae. The 20th Brigade, now under Brigadier Victor Windeyer, was chosen as the lead assault unit and on 1 September it began embarking at Milne Bay. Departing the following day, they were transported to the Buna–Morobe area where it linked up with the 57 landing craft that had been assigned to the operation. On the night of 3/4 September they began the 80 miles (130 km) run to the landing beaches, arriving just before dawn.

At 0630 hours on 4 September the 20th Brigade launched the initial assault under the cover of naval bombardment. Two battalions were landed on the main beach, codenamed Red Beach, while one more was landed 3 miles (4.8 km) west at Yellow Beach. Experiencing no opposition on the beaches, patrols were sent out to effect a link up along the beachhead. 35 minutes later as the 26th Brigade came ashore, they were attacked by nine Japanese aircraft which inflicted a number of casualties on the Australians in the LCIs, with eight personnel being killed, including the commanding officer of the 2/23rd Battalion, while another 20 were wounded. The following day, the 26th Brigade passed through the perimeter that had been set up by the 20th Brigade and began to advance along the coast towards Lae, crossing the Buso river before nightfall on 5 September. That night, the 24th Brigade, which had been held back as the divisional reserve, landed at the beachhead.

After establishing their supply bases the two Australian divisions raced each other to Lae. The 7th Division entered the town several hours ahead of the 9th Division on 16 September. The 9th Division's advance had been held up by Japanese resistance and difficulties with crossing the rivers between the landing beaches and Lae.

Huon Peninsula campaign

The capture of Lae ahead of schedule meant that the focus of Allied operations could then be shifted upon an advance up the Huon Peninsula, which was strategically important to the Allies as it would allow them to establish air and naval bases for future operations. On 22 September 1943, only six days after the fall of Lae, the 20th Brigade made an amphibious landing at Scarlet Beach, 10 kilometres (6.2 mi) north of Finschhafen. Because of the haste with which the operation had been put together, there had been no time for rehearsals and this, coupled with faulty maps and the fact that the landing took place in darkness, resulted in the majority of the brigade being landed on the wrong beach. Allied intelligence estimates of Japanese strength around Finschhafen were also faulty, with an expected force of between 500 and 2,100, although the Japanese really had around 5,000 personnel in the area.

Nevertheless, after a week of heavy fighting against well-entrenched Japanese troops, the Australians captured the town and airfield of Finschhafen, declaring it liberated on 2 October.

However, most of the Japanese that had been around Finschhafen managed to retreat to a 1,000-metre-high (3,300 ft) mountain around Sattelberg. On 16 October they launched a counterattack from there. In response to this, the 26th Brigade was brought up to relieve the 20th, and by 25 October the Japanese counterattack was beaten off. The 9th Division then went on the offensive against Sattelberg on 7 November. With intermittent and sometimes heavy air support, the Australian troops worked to uproot the Japanese from the strategically important peak. It fell to the 9th Division on 25 November 1943, after the 2/48th Battalion reached the summit. It was during this final assault that Sergeant Tom Derrick carried out the actions that led to him receiving the Victoria Cross.

==== Borneo ====
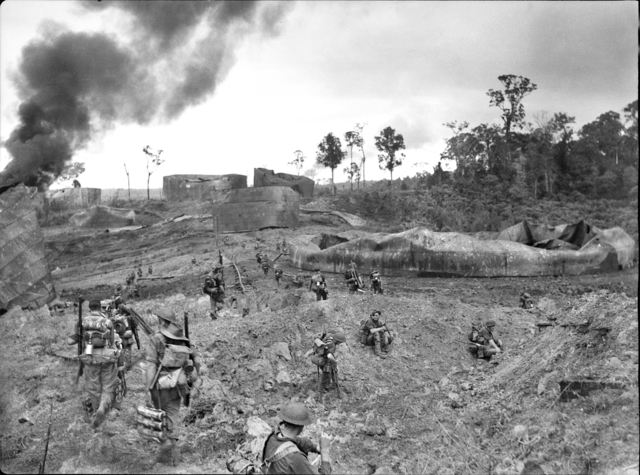
Infantry from the 2/23rd Infantry Battalion advancing through wrecked oil storage tanks at Tank Hill, Tarakan. (AWM 090932)

In January 1944 the 9th Division was relieved by the 5th Division around Sio and progressively over the following two months they were brought back to Australia. After a period of leave the division once again re-formed on the Atherton Tablelands. Due to high personnel turnover in this period as personnel were discharged or transferred to other units, many of the division's units had to be virtually rebuilt from scratch. Indeed, in order to bring the division's infantry units up to strength an entire Militia battalion, consisting of nearly 400 personnel from the 62nd Battalion, was broken up to provide reinforcements.

Due to rapid developments in the war and strategic uncertainty over the role of Australian forces in the Pacific, the 9th Division remained in Australia for over a year before seeing action once more. While the Australian I Corps (of which the 9th Division was part) had originally been intended to participate in the liberation of the Philippines, these plans were dropped, and the Corps was instead tasked with the liberation of Borneo. This would be the division's final involvement in the war and its participation in the campaign was broken up into two primary operations: a landing on Tarakan and another on Brunei and Labuan.

Tarakan

The 26th Brigade group was assigned the task of capturing Tarakan Island and destroying the Japanese garrison. Japanese forces on the island were estimated at 2,000 personnel along with around 250 civilians working in the oil plants. On 30 April 1945 a small force of commandos from the 2/4th Commando Squadron, along with a battery of 25-pounder field guns from the 2/7th Field Regiment, were landed on Sadau Island off the coast of Tarakan, from where they would provide indirect fire support during the landing. The following day, 1 May, at 0640 the battery on Sadau opened the preliminary bombardment along with two cruisers and six destroyers stationed offshore. At 0656 hours the main assault began as the LCIs carrying the two battalions that would lead the attack—the 2/23rd and 2/48th—crossed the line of departure and headed towards the landing beach at Lingkas.

Although initially Japanese opposition to the landing was light, as the Australians advanced inland from the landing beach, the resistance grew in its intensity and it was mid June by the time that the main Japanese force was broken up and mopping up operations began. These operations continued throughout July until starvation forced the majority of those remaining to surrender. The Australians lost 250 killed and 670 wounded in this operation, while the Japanese lost around 1,500 personnel killed and another 250 captured trying to defend the island.

Brunei and Labuan

The remainder of the 9th Division landed in the Labuan and Brunei area on 10 June 1945. Tasked with securing Brunei Bay in order to establish a naval base and secure vital oil and rubber production facilities, 14,079 personnel from the division took part, just under half of a total of 30,000 that were assigned to the operation. Following a preliminary naval and aerial bombardment, the 24th Brigade landed at the southern end of Labuan island, which situated as it was at the entrance of Brunei Bay, commanded the approach to northern Borneo. At the same time, the 20th Brigade landed near Brooketon, on a small peninsula in the southern end of the bay. A third, albeit smaller, landing was made by one of the 20th Brigade's battalions—the 2/15th—on the small island of Muara. The island had not been garrisoned by the Japanese and all the Australian landings went in unopposed.

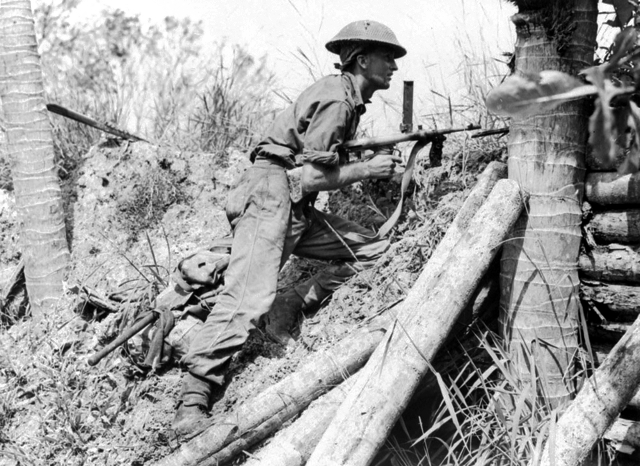
An infantryman from the Australian 2/43rd Battalion in a bomber dispersal bay at Labuan airstrip on 10 June 1945

The 20th Brigade rapidly secured Brunei town against relatively light opposition, suffering only 40 casualties in this campaign. The 24th Brigade, however, encountered greater opposition in taking the island of Labuan, where the defenders withdrew to an inland stronghold where they held out along dense jungle covered ridges and muddy swamps. In order to subdue the Japanese resistance an intense naval and artillery bombardment was laid down over the course of a week before an assault was put in by two companies of infantry supported by tanks and flamethrowers.

After securing Labuan, the 24th Brigade was landed on the northern shore of Brunei Bay on 16 June, while the 20th Brigade continued to consolidate the southern lodgement by advanced south-west along the coast towards Kuching and securing the hinterland as well. The 2/32nd Battalion landed at Padas Bay and seized the town of Weston, before sending out patrols towards Beaufort, 23 kilometres (14 mi) inland. Held by 800–1,000 Japanese, on 27 June an attack was carried out there by the 2/43rd Battalion. Amid a torrential downpour and encountering difficult terrain, the 2/32nd Battalion secured the south bank of the Padas River, while one company from the 2/43rd was sent to take the town and another marched to the flanks, to take up ambush positions along the route that the Japanese were expected to withdraw along. The 2/28th Battalion secured the lines of communication north of the river. On the night of 27/28 June the Japanese launched six counterattacks which devolved into hand-to-hand combat. Amid appalling conditions, one company became isolated and the next morning another was sent to its aid to attack the Japanese from the rear. Fighting its way through numerous Japanese positions, the company killed at least 100 Japanese and one of its members, Private Tom Starcevich, was later awarded the Victoria Cross for his efforts.

Following this, the Japanese began to withdraw from Beaufort and the Australians began a slow, cautious advance using indirect fire to limit casualties. By 12 July they occupied Papar, and from there sent out patrols to the north and along the river until the cessation of hostilities. By August the fighting came to an end. The division's total casualties in this operation were 114 killed and 221 wounded, while the Japanese lost at least 1,234 personnel.

=== Disbandment ===
Following the end of the war the 9th Division remained in Borneo and performed emergency relief and occupation duties until the arrival of Indian troops in January 1946. The 9th Division began gradually demobilising on 1 October 1945 with soldiers with dependants or long service being the first to be discharged. The division's headquarters was disbanded on 10 February 1946 and the last unit of the division was disbanded in May 1946. While the majority of the division's personnel returned civilian life after the war, some continued to serve with the British Commonwealth Occupation Force in Japan, joining the 66th Infantry Battalion.

== Casualties ==
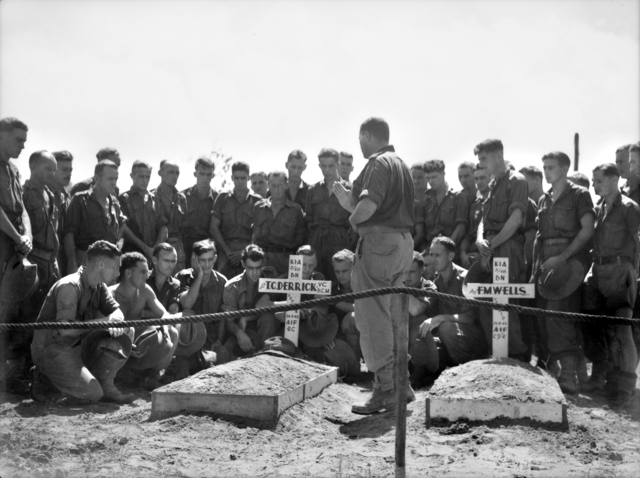
Men of the 2/48th Battalion gather around the grave of Lieutenant T.C. Derrick VC DCM on Tarakan (AWM 108261)

The 9th Division suffered a total of 2,732 killed in action, 7,501 wounded and 1,863 captured. These 12,096 casualties represent approximately one quarter of the personnel who served with the division.

== Decorations ==
The 9th Division was the most highly decorated of the four AIF divisions raised during the war. Seven of its members received the Victoria Cross, the nation's highest award for gallantry, these were (in alphabetical order by surname):

- Tom Derrick; (Note: Derrick's VC was not awarded posthumously, although he was killed later in the war.)
- John Hurst Edmondson (posthumous);
- Percival Eric Gratwick (posthumous);
- Arthur Stanley Gurney (posthumous);
- William Henry Kibby (posthumous);
- John Bernard Mackey (posthumous); and
- Leslie Thomas Starcevich.

Military decorations awarded to members of the 9th Division include:

- 7 Victoria Crosses (VC);
- 41 Companion of the Distinguished Service Orders (DSO);
- Order of the British Empire: 9 Officers of the Order (OBE) and 29 Members of the Order (MBE);
- 119 Military Crosses (MC);
- 57 Distinguished Conduct Medals (DCM);
- 212 Military Medals (MM);
- 9 British Empire Medals (BEM);
- 611 Mentioned in Despatches (MID – not a post-nominal).

== Structure ==
The 9th Division's structure was as follows:

- Infantry units
  - 18th Brigade – to 7th Division, 1941
  - 20th Brigade – from 7th Division, 1941.
    - 2/13th Australian Infantry Battalion, New South Wales (NSW)
    - 2/15th Australian Infantry Battalion, Queensland (Qld)
    - 2/17th Australian Infantry Battalion, NSW
  - 24th Brigade – from 8th Division, 1940
    - 2/25th Australian Infantry Battalion, Qld (to 25th Infantry Brigade, 1940)
    - 2/28th Australian Infantry Battalion, Western Australia (WA)
    - 2/32nd Australian Infantry Battalion, Victoria and Western Australia (Vic & WA)
    - 2/43rd Australian Infantry Battalion, South Australia (SA)
  - 25th Brigade – to 7th Division, 1941
  - 26th Brigade
    - 2/23rd Australian Infantry Battalion, NSW.
    - 2/24th Australian Infantry Battalion, Vic.
    - 2/48th Australian Infantry Battalion, SA
    - 2/4th Commando Squadron (from Aug 1943)
- Artillery regiments
  - 2/7th Field Regiment, Royal Australian Artillery
  - 2/8th Field Regiment, RAA
  - 2/12th Field Regiment, RAA (ex 2/2nd Medium Reg., Corps Artillery)
  - 2/3rd Anti-Tank Regiment, RAA (from 8th Div., 194?)
- Engineer companies
  - 2/3rd Field Company, Royal Australian Engineers, Tasmania/WA/SA (from 6th Div., 194?)
  - 2/13th Field Company, RAE, Qld (ex 2/1st Field Park Company)
  - 2/15th Field Company, RAE. Attached to 9th Division in 1945 for the landings at Labuan during Operation Oboe. (See Beach groups for more information)
  - 2/16th Field Company
  - 2/7th Field Company, RAE, Qld (ex Corps Troops)
  - 2/4th Field Park Company, RAE, WA (ex 8th Division)
- Other units
  - 2/2nd Australian Machine-Gun Battalion (from 7th Division, 1942)
  - 2/3rd Australian Pioneer Battalion (from 7th Division, 1942)
  - 2/4th Australian Pioneer Battalion
  - 9th Australian Divisional Cavalry (from 8th Division, 1941)

== Commanders ==
- Major General Henry Wynter (October 1940 – February 1941)
- Lieutenant General Sir Leslie Morshead (February 1941 – March 1943)
- Major General George Wootten (March 1943 – October 1945).

== Quotes ==
- [A] batch of some 50 or 60 Australian prisoners were marched off close behind us—immensely big and powerful men, who without question represented an elite formation of the British Empire, a fact that was also evident in battle.
  —Lieutenant General Erwin Rommel, Commander, German Afrika Korps, Battle of Tobruk, 1941.
- We could not have won the battle [i.e. the Second Battle of El Alamein, 1942] in twelve days without the magnificent 9th Australian Division.
  —General Bernard Montgomery, writing about the Allied breakthrough in North Africa.
- My God, I wish we had [the] 9th Australian Division with us this morning [D-Day].
  —Major General Freddie de Guingand, Chief of Staff, Allied Land-force Headquarters Europe, 1944.

== Notes ==
Footnotes

Citations
