= Operation Dexterity =

1944 Allied military operation in the Pacific

- Part of World War II, Pacific War
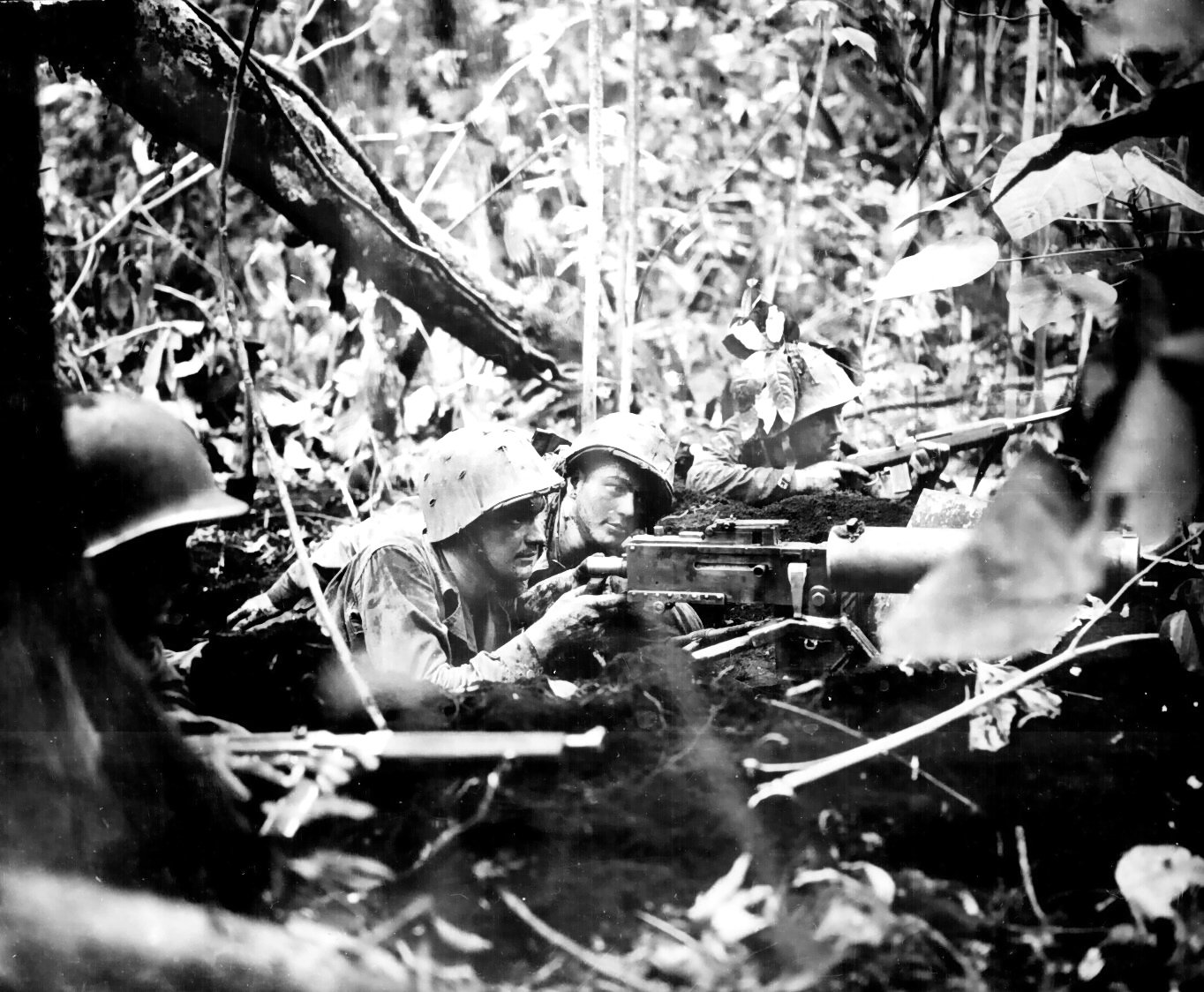
- U.S. Marines in the jungle at Cape Gloucester
| Date | December 15, 1943 – March 9, 1944 |
| Location | Arawe and Cape Gloucester, New Britain, and Saidor, Territory of New Guinea |
| Result | Allied victory |

Belligerents
| United States; Australia | Japan |

Commanders and leaders
| Douglas MacArthur; Walter Krueger | Yasushi Sakai; Iwao Matsuda |

Strength
| ~19,000 | ~10,500 |

Casualties and losses
| ~500 killed | ~4,500 killed |

Operation Dexterity was a military operation, part of Operation Cartwheel in the South West Pacific Area (SWPA) for the Allies in the Pacific theater of World War II. The operation was directed by the Supreme Allied Commander in the SWPA, General Douglas MacArthur. Dexterity included amphibious landings at Arawe on 15 December 1943, and Cape Gloucester on 26 December 1943 in the northwest of New Britain, the capture of the Imperial Japanese held Tuluvu aerodrome on the 30 December 1943 and the amphibious landing at Saidor on 2 January 1944. The final battle was the landing at Talasea in March. The operation ended on 9 March 1944.

== History and planning ==
The Empire of Japan had largely achieved its objectives in the Pacific region in the spring of 1942, with almost the entire area between Burma and the Bismarck Archipelago under Japanese control. Further Japanese offensives against the Allied lines were planned to force them into a single decisive battle and then request negotiations for their surrender. The initial Japanese offensive failed during the Battle of Midway in June 1942 and subsequently the Japanese attempt to also capture Port Moresby in New Guinea collapsed, ending the Japanese offensive run in the Pacific theater of operations for the rest of the war. The allies in the South Pacific began their first counter-offensive against the Japanese-held island Guadalcanal in August 1942 and the Japanese forces were forced onto the defensive.

To keep the Japanese cowed and begin the Allied advance towards the Japanese home islands, the Allied military leadership envisaged an advance through the Pacific over two main lines of attack. Admiral Chester W. Nimitz would lead Allied forces in the Pacific and General Douglas MacArthur would advance Allied operations against the Japanese in the Southwest Pacific. Landings along the coast of New Guinea were planned which constituted the first step towards a return to the Philippines and the conquest of the Gilbert Islands. The operation in New Guinea was known as Operation Cartwheel which began on 30 June 1943 with the objective to conquer New Guinea, the Bismarck Archipelago and Rabaul. Until mid-September 1943, the fighting focused on the eastern part of New Guinea, while a decision was made on 22 September 1943 to land in West New Britain.

Operation Dexterity was to be conducted in three separate phases:

- Operation Lazaretto – Planned landing in southern New Britain at the plantation of Lindenhafen, approximately 5 km from Gasmata on 14 November 1943 and the neutralization of Japanese base at Gasmata for protection of eastern flank for the subsequent operation. This operation was never undertaken and replaced by Operation Director.

Units: 126th Regimental Combat Team (RCT) and elements of the 32nd Infantry Division and the Sixth Army.

- Operation Director – Landing in southwestern New Britain at Arawe as a diversion for Operation Backhander, Arawe was planned as patrol boat base.

Units: 112th Regimental Combat Team

- Operation Backhander – Landing in northwestern New Britain at Cape Gloucester to capture local Japanese airfields and convert them into a major Allied airbase.

Units: 1st Marine Division.

- Operation Michaelmas – Landing in New Guinea at Saidor to prevent the withdrawal of Japanese troops retreating in the advance of the Australian Army from Finschhafen.

Units: 32nd Infantry Division

After the successful conclusion of these three phases the Allies landed at Talasea to try to cut off the thousands of retreating Japanese troops under the command of Major General Iwao Matsuda who successfully escaped to defensive lines in central New Britain after the small force of Japanese defenders delayed the Marines from quickly advancing to the withdrawal route.

== Geography and Environment ==
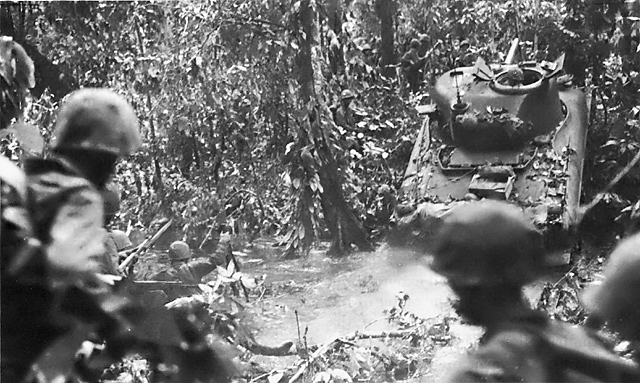
An American M4 Sherman advances through rainforest during Operation Dexterity

Like most of the islands of the South Pacific, the Islands of the Bismarck Archipelago are of volcanic origin with steep mountain slopes, jungle and treacherous marshes, where malaria was a problem for all deployed troops. The hot, tropical climate was rarely ameliorated by the torrential rain storms and dense clouds which afflicted the region. The inhabited islands had been managed by Australia as a League of Nations Mandate before the war, and there was only a settlement of Westerners originally settled by Imperial Germany before the First World War that was centered on coconut plantations and missionary complexes.

== The Japanese on New Britain ==
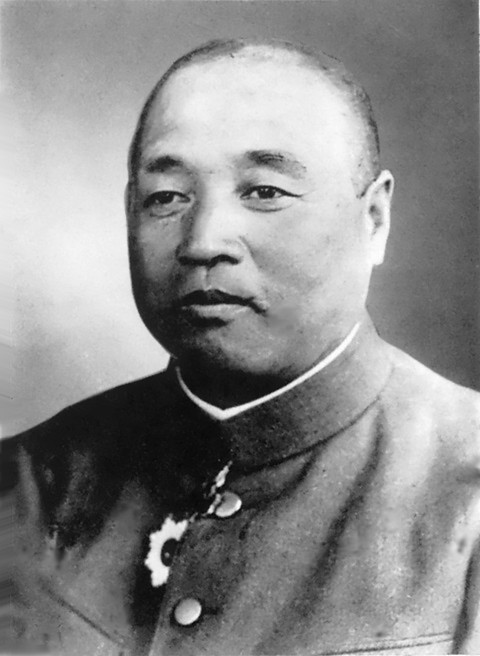
General Hitoshi Imamura, Commander of 8th Area Army in Rabaul

The high command of the 8th Area Army of the Japanese Imperial Army in Rabaul controlled the Japanese actions in the Solomon Islands, New Guinea and the Bismarck Islands. In January 1942, the Japanese had taken the strategically important port of Rabaul in northeastern New Britain and in subsequent months the largest and most important Japanese naval and air base in the Pacific was constructed at that location. The 8th Area Army was commanded by General Hitoshi Imamura who had at his disposal nearly 200,000 men. In early 1943, the Japanese leadership had expected that the Allies would attempt to break the inner Japanese defensive belt in the Pacific and attack the bases on New Guinea, the Mariana Islands, Palau and the Philippines. General Imamura therefore foresaw an attack on New Britain, at the latest after the Allies had occupied New Ireland, which was expected in February or March 1944.

The 8th Area Army relied exclusively on barge and submarine traffic from Rabaul to New Guinea, because of Allied air superiority. In September 1943, Major General Iwao Matsuda took over the 65th Brigade, the various pioneers and debarkation units, and a number of troops of the 51st Division, whose main units were on New Guinea in the fight against Australian troops. Two companies of 115th Division and provisional infantry companies formed from artillery and engineer elements of the 66th Division, and about half of the 51st Reconnaissance Regiment belonged to General Matsuda's command. General Matsuda, a highly experienced officer, established his headquarters near the airfield of Cape Gloucester. On 5 October 1943, all of Matsuda's units came under the command of the 17th Division which was commanded by Lieutenant General Yasushi Sakai, who had arrived in December 1943 from the Japanese theater of operations in China.

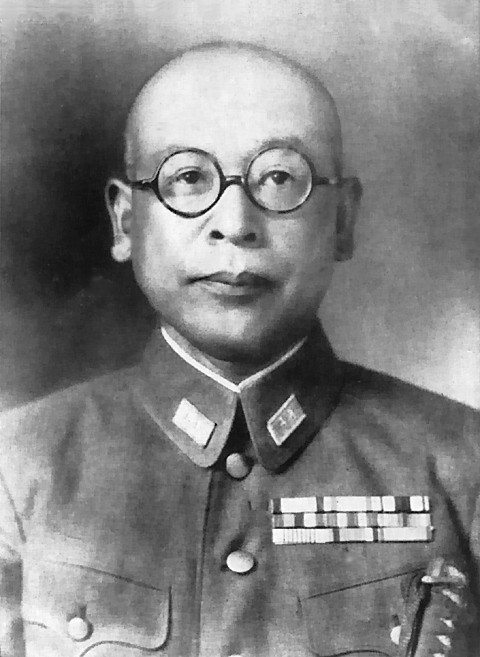
Lieutenant General Yasushi Sakai, Commander of 17th Division

General Sakai set up his headquarters at Malalia in the vicinity of Cape Hoskins on the East Williaumez Peninsula. The 17th Division's troops began immediately ordering the expansions of the defensive lines. The Japanese headquarters was established in an existing concrete bunker at the foot of Talawe Mountain, which was surrounded by dense, tropical vegetation. Smaller bunkers and shelters for machine gun positions were sited at possible Allied landing beaches five miles southeast of Cape Gloucester. Two hills known later as Target-Hill and Hill 660 served as focal points for the Japanese defenses. Thus about half of all available Japanese troops in the west of the island were in positions that could effectively contribute to the defense of Cape Gloucester.

On 12 December 1943, General Yasushi Sakai advised all commanders of his units about an imminent Allied invasion. The large volumes of Allied landing ships along the ports of New Guinea did not convince the Japanese of the scheduled operations of Allied forces. False invasion alarms were commonplace up to the end of 1943. With the Allies' air superiority increasing, the bombing of Rabaul and Wewak brought the realization that the invasion of New Britain was imminent.

== Preparatory actions ==
=== Reconnaissance ===
Two days after the decision to proceed with the operation was taken by the Allied commanders, the US 6th Army's Alamo Scouts began to deploy in the area of Cape Gloucester. They neared the coast by torpedo boat, then transferred to dinghies and landed on the beaches. From there they reconnoitered the Japanese defenses by direct observations or through contact with the local aboriginal population of New Britain.

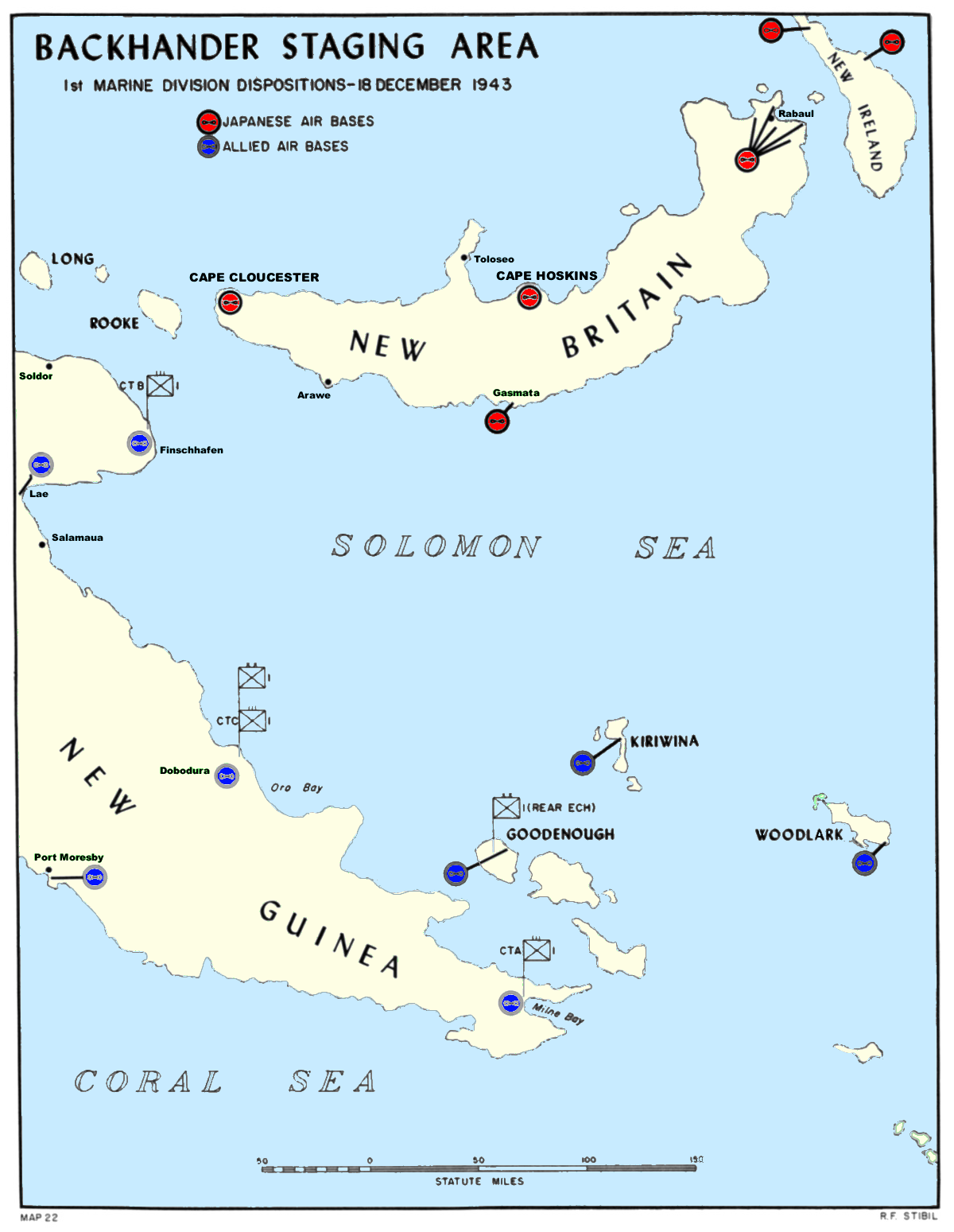
Bases of the Japanese and allied in December 1943

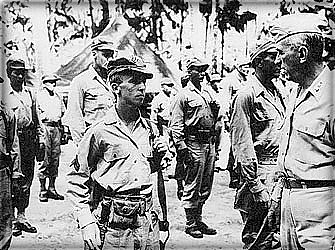
General Krueger with Alamo Scouts

== Film ==
- Attack: The Battle for New Britain (1944), Produzent: Frank Capra – Documentary, DVD, USA, (2003)
