= No. 78 Squadron RAAF =

Royal Australian Air Force squadron

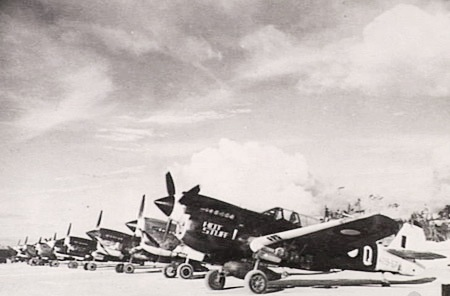
- No. 78 Squadron Kittyhawks in late 1944
- Active: 1943–1948
- Country: Australia
- Branch: Royal Australian Air Force
- Type: Fighter
- Engagements: World War II: New Britain campaign; New Guinea campaign; Borneo campaign

Insignia
- Squadron code: HU

Aircraft flown
- Fighter: P-40 Kittyhawk (1943–1945); P-51D Mustang (1946–1948)
- Trainer: CAC Wirraway (1946)

No. 78 Squadron was a Royal Australian Air Force (RAAF) fighter squadron of World War II. It was formed in July 1943 as part of expansion of the RAAF's fighter force, and was assigned to mobile striking forces for the duration of the war.

After completing training, No. 78 Squadron was deployed to the combat zone north of Australia in October 1943. From November that year until September 1944 the squadron supported the advance of the Allied ground forces through western New Britain and the north coast of New Guinea by attacking Japanese positions, providing fighter protection for recently established beachheads, and escorting Australian and United States bombers. From late 1944 until mid-1945 it operated against Japanese positions and shipping in the eastern Netherlands East Indies. The squadron took part in the Borneo campaign during the final weeks of the war. No. 78 Squadron was reduced to a cadre after it returned to Australia in December 1945, but received new aircraft in 1946 and undertook training exercises until being disbanded in April 1948.

== History ==
=== Operations during 1943 ===
During 1943 the RAAF received 399 P-40 Kittyhawk fighter aircraft. Their arrival allowed the service to expand its combat force by forming five new Kittyhawk-equipped squadrons to join the three squadrons that had operated the type in the South West Pacific area since 1942.

No. 78 Squadron was formed at Camden, New South Wales, on 20 July 1943. It was the fourth of the new Kittyhawk squadrons to be established, following No. 84 Squadron in February, No. 86 Squadron in March and No. 82 Squadron in June; the final unit, No. 80 Squadron, was formed in September. No. 78 Squadron began to receive its P-40N Kittyhawk fighters from 2 August 1943, and conducted training with these aircraft until early October. The squadron began moving from Camden to Woodlark Island in the war zone off New Guinea on 12 October 1943. However, its destination was changed to Kiriwina Island, and the squadron became operational there as part of No. 73 Wing on 27 November. This wing was controlled by No. 10 (Operational) Group, a mobile formation established on 13 November to support the planned Allied advance along the north coast of New Guinea.

During late November and December 1944, No. 78 Squadron participated in attacks against Japanese positions in New Britain alongside No. 76 and No. 77 Squadrons, which were also equipped with Kittyhawks. These operations were undertaken to support the landings conducted by American forces at Arawe on 15 December and Cape Gloucester on the 26th of the month. In addition to bombing and strafing Japanese positions, No. 78 Squadron also escorted RAAF and United States Army Air Forces (USAAF) bombers on several occasions.

=== Operations during 1944 ===
No. 78 Squadron moved to Nadzab on the mainland of New Guinea in January 1944. This redeployment was completed on the 12th of the month, and the squadron began operations as part of No. 78 Wing the next day. Many of the ground attack and escort sorties undertaken by No. 78 Squadron during January supported the Australian Army forces engaged in the Markham and Ramu Valley – Finisterre Range campaign. The squadron was mainly used to escort Australian and USAAF bomber and transport aircraft in February and early March, but it also conducted a small number of ground attack sorties. These escort duties were unpopular among No. 78 Wing's fighter pilots, who believed that the American officers in charge of the air effort in New Guinea were assigning Australian units to unimportant tasks. In reality, all Allied fighter units recently arrived in New Guinea were initially tasked with escort missions as part of a 'probationary' period. In March 1944, No. 78 Wing moved to Cape Gloucester in New Britain to replace the USAAF's 8th Fighter Group, which was being transferred to Nadzab. No. 78 Squadron's advance echelon departed Nadzab on 12 March, and the entire squadron became operational in New Britain late in the month. During the last week of March, No. 78 Squadron and the other units of No. 78 Wing struck Japanese positions in New Britain and nearby Garove island in co-operation with United States Navy PT boats. On 27 March four No. 78 Squadron Kittyhawks attacked and sank two American patrol boats, killing seven sailors and wounding five more. The inquiry conducted after this incident found that the pilots had not been informed that friendly ships were in the area.

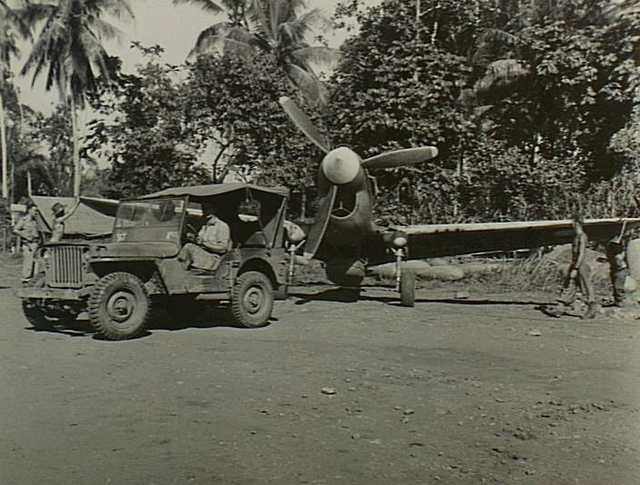
A No. 78 Squadron P-40 being towed by a jeep while at an airfield near Hollandia in July 1944

During April 1944, No. 78 Wing received orders to move again, this time to support Operation Reckless, the American landing at Hollandia in western New Guinea. The main party of the squadron departed Cape Gloucester on 17 April bound for Tadji airstrip on the mainland of New Guinea, and its Kittyhawks arrived there on the 24th of the month. No. 78 Squadron began flying patrols over the American beachhead at Hollandia the next day. The squadron continued to provide air defence for Hollandia and Tadji throughout early May. From 7 to 10 May a detachment of 16 Kittyhawks from No. 78 Squadron operated from the Hollandia beachhead; owing to food shortages in the area the pilots arrived with rations for four days loaded in their aircraft. On 15 May the unit moved permanently to an airfield near Hollandia, from which it escorted USAAF bombers and formed part of the force protecting the US Army landings at Wakde on 17 May and Biak on the 27th. Overall, the squadron flew 601 sorties during May. Its operations over Biak included its only air-to-air combat of the war. On 3 June, 16 Kittyhawks from No. 78 Squadron intercepted a group of 12 Nakajima Ki-43 fighters and two Nakajima B5N bombers near Biak. The Australian airmen downed five Ki-43s and two B5Ns for the loss of one Kittyhawk and its pilot. This was the last major air battle fought by the RAAF during the Pacific War. On 10 June, eight No. 78 Squadron Kittyhawks were escorting a convoy when they sighted a Japanese Kawasaki Ki-61 fighter. Two of the Australian aircraft attacked the Ki-61 and shot it down near Japen Island. This was the final aerial victory achieved by the RAAF during the New Guinea campaign. No. 78 Squadron continued to fly defensive patrols over Hollandia until 20 July, when it was redeployed to Noemfoor island. This was the squadron's sixth move in nine months, and the intensive effort needed to pack and unpack stores on each occasion caused widespread fatigue among airmen and ground crew.

From 21 July 1944, No. 78 Squadron supported the US military's offensive through western New Guinea. The squadron again operated with US Navy PT boats during strikes on Japanese positions in the Vogelkop Peninsula and shipping in Geelvink Bay during July; these operations were undertaken to support the US Army landing at Sansapor on 30 July. Many of No. 78 Wing's pilots completed their nine-month operational tour during July and were replaced by inexperienced pilots. During the first three weeks of August the squadron flew patrols over the beachhead at Sansapor. The intensive operations over Sansapor were trying, with the official history stating that No. 78 Wing was "pushed almost to the limit of its operational capacity"; two No. 78 Squadron aircraft were lost during this period. No. 78 Wing attacked Japanese airfields in the Vogelkop Peninsula throughout September, and No. 78 Squadron flew 363 sorties against these targets. The squadron also struck airfields on the Bomberai Peninsula as well as Japanese shipping in the easternmost islands of the Netherlands East Indies (NEI) during the last months of 1944. These operations were undertaken to support the American landings in the Philippines, which began in October, and often involved lengthy flights. No. 10 (Operational) Group was redesignated the First Tactical Air Force on 25 October; at this time No. 78 Squadron remained part of No. 78 Wing alongside No. 75 and No. 80 Squadrons. No. 78 Squadron aircraft began staging through airfields on Morotai from early December, and moved to the island between 21 December and January 1945. During November, Len Waters, the only known Aboriginal Australian fighter pilot of World War II, was posted to No. 78 Squadron. He remained with the unit until the end of the war and completed 95 combat sorties.

=== Operations from 1945 to 1948 ===
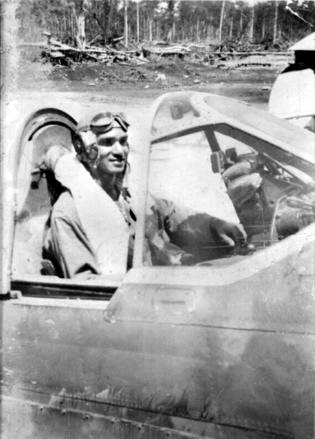
Len Waters in a Kittyhawk fighter during 1945

No. 78 Squadron continued to attack Japanese positions in the eastern NEI from Morotai in early 1945. The squadron flew 267 sorties in January during which its aircraft fired 77,000 rounds of machine-gun ammunition and dropped 153,630 pounds (69,690 kg) of bombs. Fewer sorties were flown during February and March, and on 10 April No. 78 Squadron ceased operations from Morotai to prepare to take part in the invasion of Tarakan, an island off the east coast of Borneo. While No. 81 Wing had originally been intended to land at Tarakan, due to delays in moving the unit from Australia No. 78 Wing was substituted shortly before the assault convoys departed Morotai. As a result, the wing had only ten days to pack its stores and prepare for its role in the landing. The main echelon of No. 78 Squadron disembarked at Tarakan on 6 May, but it took much longer than had been anticipated to repair the island's airfield and the unit was unable to recommence flying operations until 18 July. During this period the squadron's ground crew worked with Australian Army engineers to build roads, and some personnel spent time on the front line.

From 20 July 1945 until the end of the war, No. 78 Squadron operated over Borneo to support the invasion of Balikpapan. Its first strike from Tarakan was flown against Japanese positions in the Sandakan area, and on 24 July aircraft from No. 75, No. 78 and No. 80 Squadrons attacked airfields near Banjarmasin. The squadron conducted its final combat operation on 9 August, and was still based at Tarakan at the time the Japanese Government's intention to surrender was announced on the 15th of the month. No. 78 Squadron had suffered 12 fatalities during the war. Following the armistice the squadron undertook leaflet dropping and reconnaissance sorties until November, when the Kittyhawks were flown to Australia. The remainder of the unit's personnel arrived at Sydney on 12 December 1945 on board the British aircraft carrier HMS Glory.

After returning to Australia, No. 78 Squadron moved to Deniliquin in New South Wales on 17 December and most of its personnel were sent on leave until 16 January. The squadron was rapidly reduced to a cadre, and comprised only 17 personnel in July 1946. The unit was located at RAAF Station Schofields near Sydney from May to August 1946, and then moved to RAAF Station Williamtown outside of Newcastle. On 4 August 1946 it received four P-51D Mustang fighters and a single CAC Wirraway trainer. No. 78 Squadron undertook training during 1947, including exercises with Australian and British warships in March and July. During April 1947 two of the squadron's Mustangs took part in a Commonwealth Scientific and Industrial Research Organisation cloud seeding experiment; in this role the aircraft sprayed silver iodide onto clouds from tanks beneath their wings with the goal of generating rain. No. 78 Squadron was disbanded on 1 April 1948.
