= 65th Independent Mixed Brigade =

- Active: 1941–45
- Country: Japan
- Branch: Imperial Japanese Army
- Size: One mixed regiment with supporting units
- Engagements: World War II: Philippines campaign (1941–1942); New Britain campaign

The 65th Independent Mixed Brigade was an infantry brigade of the Imperial Japanese Army raised during World War II. The brigade was formed as the 65th Brigade in 1941 from a previously existing independent infantry group. It undertook garrison duties on Formosa and then took part in the fighting in the Philippines in 1942. Later, the brigade was dispersed and elements took part in the New Britain campaign. Late in the war, it was converted into an independent mixed brigade to undertake home defense in Japan.

== History ==
Formed as the 65th Brigade in early 1941 in Hiroshima, Japan, it was raised from the previously existing 65th Independent Infantry Group, which had itself been raised in 1940–1941 and consisted of the 122nd, 141st and 142nd Infantry Regiments. Upon its conversion to a brigade, the formation received a small number of support units. After occupying Formosa, the brigade fought in the Philippines, as part of the Japanese Fourteenth Area Army.

Following the decision to reinforce the New Guinea area, in November and December 1942, the brigade was dispersed, with one regiment (the 141st) along with the brigade headquarters and half its supporting elements moving to Rabaul to become part of the 18th Army; meanwhile other elements of the brigade were sent to other locations. Its first commander was Major General Nara Akira. Under Major General Iwao Matsuda, the brigade's main element—the 141st Infantry Regiment—later took part in the Battle of Cape Gloucester, during the New Britain campaign, in late 1943 before withdrawing towards Rabaul. According to Gordon Rottman, around this time the brigade was "dissolved" and its units reassigned.

Late in the war, the brigade was re-raised as an independent mixed brigade for home defense and was assigned to the Eastern District Army in 1944–1945; in the final stages of the war there were plans to raise the 321st Division drawing manpower from the 65th, which was based in the Izu Islands.

== Structure ==
In its configuration as an independent mixed brigade, the 65th consisted of the following units:

- 27th Independent Mixed Regiment
- 1st Special Garrison Battalion
- 246th Independent Motor Transport Company
- 105th Special Sea Duty Company
- 65th Independent Mixed Brigade Field Hospital
