= Cape Gloucester Airport =

Airport in West New Britain, Papua New Guinea

- IATA: CGC; ICAO: AYCG; LID: CPG

Summary
- Airport type: Public
- Location: Cape Gloucester, Papua New Guinea
- Elevation AMSL: 78 ft / 24 m
- Coordinates: 05°27′33″S 148°25′57″E

Map

Runways
Direction	Length		Surface
Direction	ft	m	Surface
03/21	3,540	1,073	Asphalt
- Source: World Aero Data

Cape Gloucester Airport is an airport in West New Britain Province, Papua New Guinea. (IATA: CGC, ICAO: AYCG). The airport is a single runway general aviation facility; at the present time there is no scheduled commercial service to the airport.

== History ==
Construction of Cape Gloucester Airport originally began in 1942 by the Australians. When the area was seized by the Japanese, it was improved into a two-runway airfield. Later, the area was liberated by the United States Marines on 30 December 1943. Three American aviation engineer battalions were sent to the airfield where they found their work impeded by heavy rains. Marine L-4 aircraft (military versions of the Piper Cub) began operating from a road near the airfield as early as 2 January, and other aircraft were able to make emergency landings. The available engineering forces planned to have the airfield operational for fighters by 1 February but American aircraft did not start operating from the strip until February 1944, but moved out by the end of March.

Cape Gloucester was later developed as an American and an Australian air base but it was never a particularly significant one. After the war, the airfield remained in use for civilian aircraft to service the Cape Gloucester area. It is not used by larger commercial flights, and is occasionally closed due to volcanic activity in the area.

=== Major USAAF units assigned ===
- 8th Fighter Group (20 February – 14 March 1944)

Headquarters, 35th Fighter Squadron, P-40 Warhawk; 80th Fighter Squadron, P-38 Lightning

- 8th Photo Reconnaissance Squadron (6th Photo Reconnaissance Group) (dates undetermined)

In addition, the 12th Defense Battalion (USMC) was assigned to the airfield between 30 December 1943 and late May 1944. Royal Australian Air Force units based at Cape Gloucester consisted of No. 78 Squadron, equipped with P-40 Warhawks. The facility, however, was not very usable, as the mud during the winter rainy season was so bad most aircraft could not use the airfield.

== See also ==
- USAAF in the Southwest Pacific
