= 17th Division (Imperial Japanese Army) =

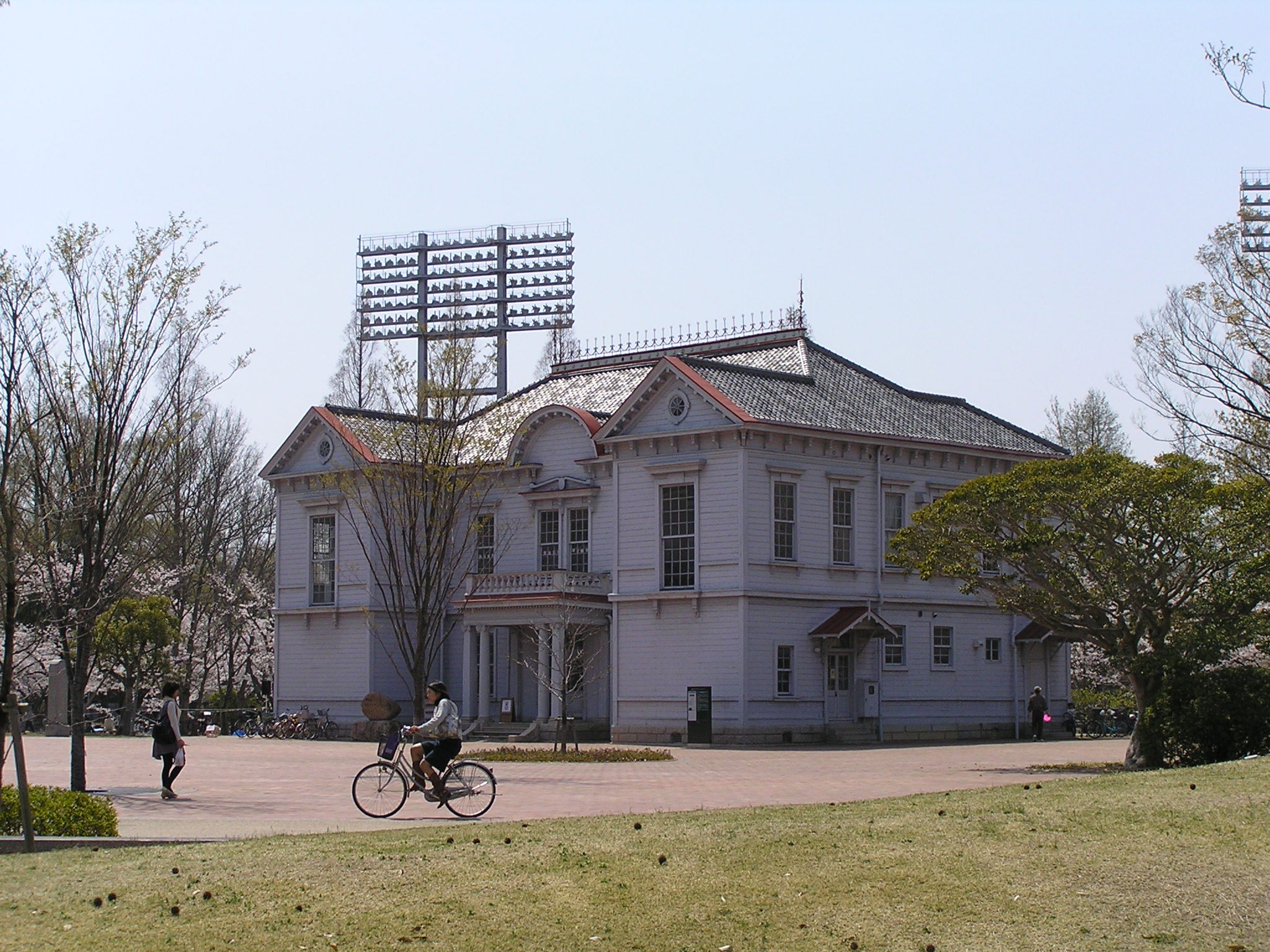
- For IJA 17th Division Officer's Club, Okayama
- Active: 13 November 1907 – 1 May 1925; 4 April 1938 – 1945
- Country: Empire of Japan
- Branch: Imperial Japanese Army
- Type: Infantry
- Garrison/HQ: Okayama, Japan
- Nickname(s): Moon Division
- Engagements: Second Sino-Japanese War; World War II

The 17th Division (第17師団, Dai-jūnana Shidan) was an infantry division in the Imperial Japanese Army. Its tsūshōgō code name was the Moon Division (月兵団, Tsuki-heidan). The 17th Division was one of two infantry divisions raised by the Imperial Japanese Army immediately after the Russo-Japanese War (1904–1905). The division received its colors on 13 November 1907. Its original headquarters was in a suburb of the city of Okayama, and its troops were recruited primarily from communities in the three prefectures of Okayama, Hiroshima, and Shimane. The first commander of the division was Lieutenant General Ichinohe Hyoe.

== Action ==
The division was raised in 1905. On 4 March 1908, the headquarters of the 17th division was transferred to rural Mitsu District, Okayama (now part of the city of Okayama). On 18 March 1915, the headquarters of the division moved to a more central location in Okayama city. However, on 26 March 1915 it was ordered to Liaoyang in Manchuria as a garrison force, before returning to Okayama 10 May 1917.

However, in 1925, the division was inactivated. This was authorized by Minister of War Ugaki Kazushige as part of a cost-saving measure during the Kato Takaaki administration, together with the 13th, 15th and 18th divisions.

The 17th Division was resurrected in 1938. At this time, it was formed as a triangular division as part of the general military buildup after the start of the Second Sino-Japanese War. Initially the 17th division was used to replace the transferred 10th division within the China Expeditionary Army, and participated in the Battle of Wuhan. Elements of the division were recalled to Japan in July 1940, while the rest garrisoned the Xuzhou area until relieved by 65th Division.

During the Pacific War, the 17th Division's main combat elements included the 53rd, 54th and 81st Infantry Regiments. These were supported by the 23rd Field Artillery Regiment, the 17th Engineer Regiment, the 17th Transport Regiment and a company of tanks. The division was assigned to the Southern Expeditionary Army Group in September 1943, and was transferred to New Britain in the Solomon Islands under command of the 8th Area Army headquartered in Rabaul. The first echelon of the 17th Division sailed from Shanghai on 20 September 1943, and arrived at Rabaul on 5 October 1943. The second echelon sailed via the same route between 21 October 1943 and 4 November 1943. A separate small convoy that sailed from Shanghai on 20 October was ambushed by the US submarine USS Grayback on 22 October 1943, and 1,087 men of the 17th Division died when auxiliary cruiser Awata Maru was sunk. The remains of convoy arrived in Rabaul on 12 November 1943.

Approximately one-third of the 17th Division's forces (the HQ staff and IJA 81st Infantry Regiment) were stationed on neighboring Bougainville Island, where they were transformed into the 38th Independent Mixed Brigade in July 1944. The remainder of the division, under the command of Lieutenant General Iwao Matsuda, fought at the Battle of Cape Gloucester and the Battle of New Britain, incorporating the 51st Reconnaissance Regiment in the process. At the end of battle the division was reduced to the couple of the independent mixed regiments guarding hospital areas. The 17th Division survivors surrendered on New Britain to Allied forces with the surrender of Japan on 15 August 1945.

== See also ==
- List of Japanese Infantry Divisions
