= Iwao Matsuda (general) =

- 松田 巌
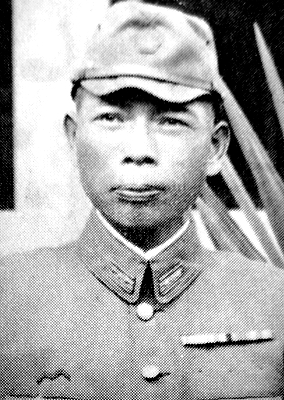
- Born: 23 February 1895; Ishikawa Prefecture, Japan
- Died: 26 March 1979 (aged 84)
- Military career
- Allegiance: Empire of Japan
- Branch: Imperial Japanese Army
- Service years: 1916–1945
- Rank: Lieutenant General
- Conflicts: Second Sino-Japanese War; World War II

Iwao Matsuda (松田 巌, Matsuda Iwao; 23 February 1895 – 26 March 1979) was a general in the Imperial Japanese Army, commanding Japanese ground forces in the Southwest Pacific during the closing months of World War II.

== Biography ==
Matsuda was born in Ishikawa Prefecture. He graduated from the 28th class of the Imperial Japanese Army Academy in May 1916 and from the 36th class of the Army Staff College in November 1924 as a specialist in army logistics. He was promoted to colonel in July 1938, and assigned command of the IJA 86th Infantry Regiment, a newly formed regiment sent directly as a garrison force to Hangzhou in the Second Sino-Japanese War. In December 1940, he was transferred to Manchukuo as an instructor for the Kwantung Army school at Gongzhuling.

In October 1941, Matsuda was appointed chief-of-staff of the IJA 23rd Division, at that time a border patrol unit in Manchukuo. He was promoted to major general in August 1942, and in September was assigned command of the IJA 14th Infantry Brigade. In February 1943, Matsuda was reassigned to the IJA 4th Shipping Command, and sent to New Guinea, where in October 1943 he became commander of the IJA 65th Infantry Brigade based at Rabaul.

Sent to Cape Gloucester on the western tip of New Britain, Matsuda commanded the 10,500 man "Matsuda Force" garrison. However, his forces were scattered over a wide area, and were overrun by the United States Marine Corps in the Battle of Cape Gloucester at the end of January 1944. Matsuda was appointed Commanding Officer of 65th Infantry Brigade in August 1943 until the end of War.
