= Cape Hoskins =

Cape in Papua New Guinea

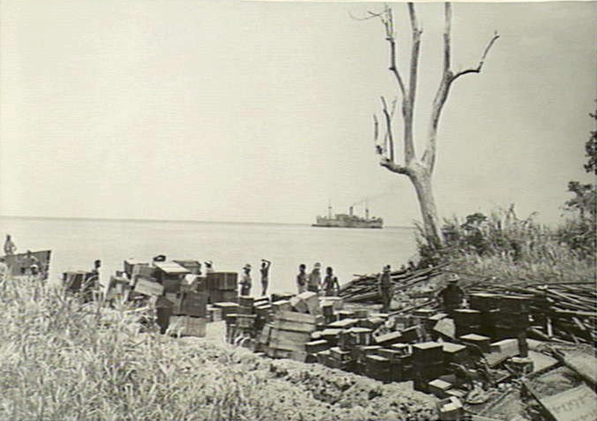
Australian troops at Cape Hoskins, 1944.

Cape Hoskins is located on the north coast of New Britain in the West New Britain Province.

== History ==
Hoskinos, as locals are known, regularly find arrowheads and spears just below the surface soil. When villagers were building state of the art outdoor latrines in 2016, they found the remnants of a 500 year old hut.

== Economy ==
Many people found work in the village's guano farms in the early 2000s. Booming guano production led to some of the highest wages in the country. However, after the guano was found to be contaminated with Escherichia coli, the farms had to pay workers in guano instead.
