= Battle of Wide Bay–Open Bay =

Coordinates: 5.083°S 152.083°E

- Part of World War II, Pacific War
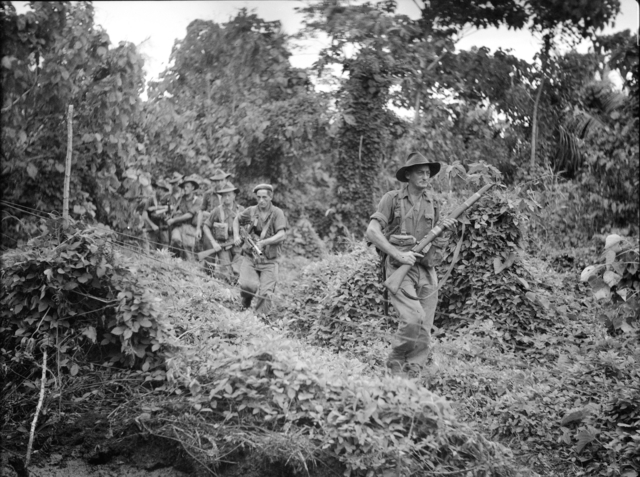
- Australian troops from the 19th Infantry Battalion patrolling Wide Bay
Date	December 1944 – April 1945
Location	Wide Bay and Open Bay, Papua New Guinea, New Britain, Territory of New Guinea
Result	Allied victory

Belligerents
Australia	Japan

Commanders and leaders
(Australia) Alan Ramsay (Australia) Raymond Sandover	(Empire of Japan) Hitoshi Imamura

The Battle of Wide Bay–Open Bay was a battle during the New Britain campaign of the Second World War. Following the arrival of the Australians on New Britain in late 1944, replacing the US garrison on the island, they began a limited offensive against the Japanese forces on the island. Pushing east from the positions previously captured by the US troops earlier in the year, after landing at Jacquinot Bay on the southern coast in November, the Australians began advancing across the island towards the Gazelle Peninsula, where they sought to isolate the numerically superior Japanese garrison. This advance was effected along two axes: Cape Hoskins to Open Bay on the northern coast, and Jacquinot Bay to Wide Bay on the southern. Once the Australians had secured a line across the island between Wide Bay and Open Bay in March and April 1945, the fighting on New Britain died down as the Australians sought to contain the larger Japanese garrison while limiting their own casualties. This situation lasted until the end of the war in August 1945.

== Background ==
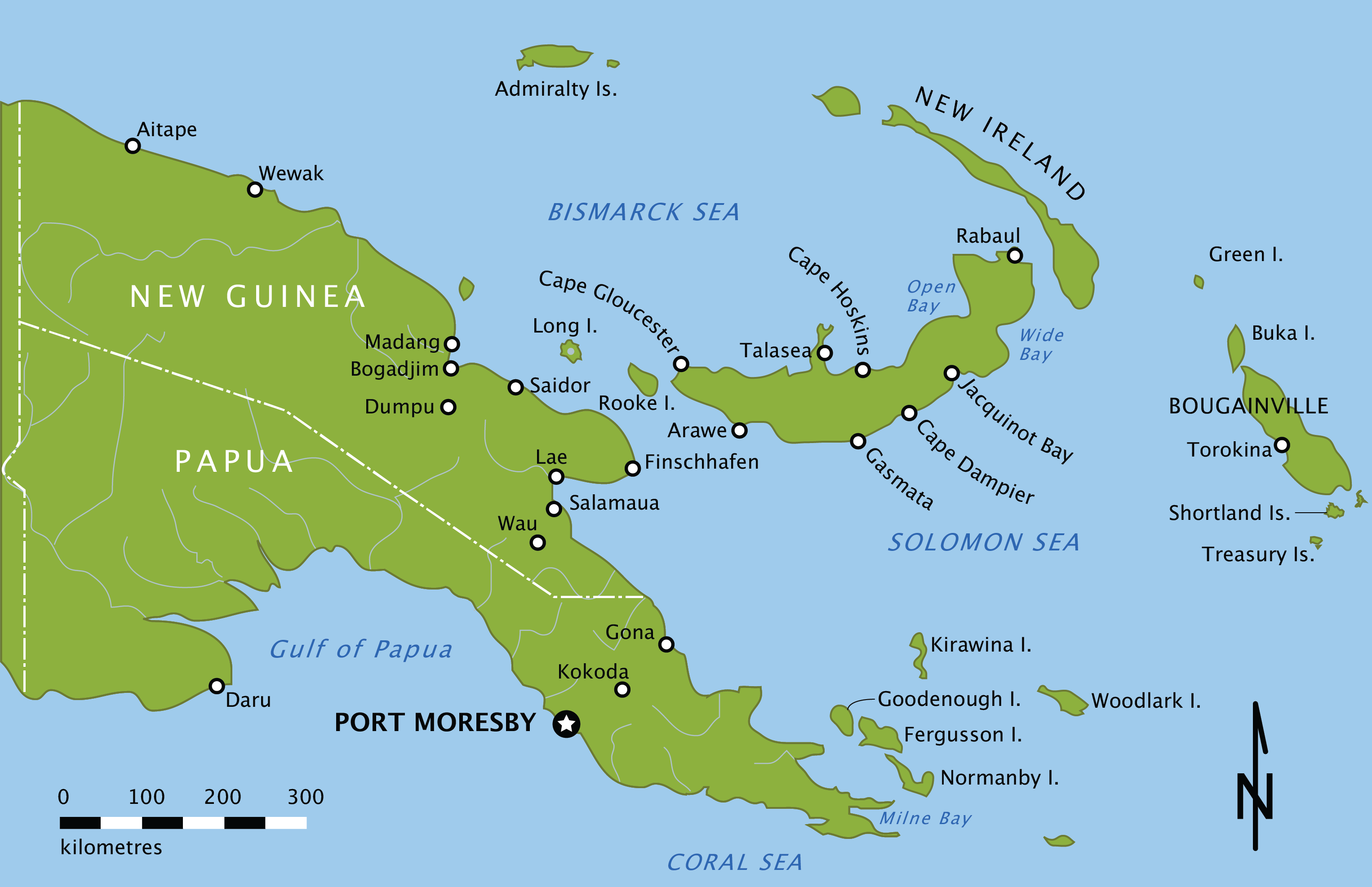
A map depicting New Guinea and New Britain, including Wide Bay and Open Bay

The Japanese had captured the island of New Britain in February 1942 after overwhelming the small Australian garrison stationed around Rabaul. The Japanese subsequently built up a large garrison on the island, consisting of around 93,000 men from General Hitoshi Imamura's Eighth Area Army. This became a lynchpin in the defensive barrier that they established following the failure of attempts to capture Port Moresby in late 1942. In December 1943, as part of Operation Cartwheel, US forces landed around Cape Gloucester and Arawe to capture vital airfields and to provide the Allies with access through the sea passage between the straits separating New Britain from New Guinea, where during late 1943 the Allies had fought to secure the Huon Peninsula. This formed part of the overarching Allied strategy of isolating the major Japanese base at Rabaul, as it had been decided that rather than destroying the base with a costly direct assault, a more prudent strategy would be to surround the base and therefore nullify it as a threat.

Following actions by the 112th Regimental Combat Team and the 1st Marine Division around Arawe and Cape Gloucester, US forces had advanced east cautiously, and by August 1944 had secured Talasea and Cape Hoskins on the northern coast. After this the US 40th Infantry Division had taken over and fighting on New Britain devolved largely into what Gavin Long, the Australian official historian, called a "tacit truce" with the US forces concentrating on defending their airfields on the west of the island – with the 40th Infantry Division concentrated largely around Cape Gloucester – and the Japanese on the eastern side being separated by a "no man's land", in which Australian-led indigenous troops from the Allied Intelligence Bureau (AIB) conducted a small scale guerilla campaign. This included actions around Wide Bay throughout June to September.

In November 1944, responsibility for Allied operations on New Britain passed from the US Army to the Australian Army. That month, the Australian 5th Division, under Major General Alan Ramsay, began arriving to replace the US 40th Infantry Division, which was needed for the fighting in the Philippines. Having greatly underestimated the strength of the Japanese garrison on the island, the Australians began a limited offensive, with the goal of advancing east from Cape Hoskins towards the Japanese stronghold around Rabaul. In November, the Australian 6th Infantry Brigade, under Brigadier Raymond Sandover began arriving. The first ground operation saw the 14th/32nd Infantry Battalion carry out a landing at Jacquinot Bay, on the southern coast of New Britain, coming ashore unopposed, while other elements – the 36th Infantry Battalion – took over around Cape Hoskins, further west. Shortly afterwards, the 6th Infantry Brigade began moving east towards Cutarp, as the 13th Infantry Brigade under Brigadier Eric McKenzie arrived to take over responsibility for the defence of the Australian base around Jacquinot Bay, along with advanced elements of the 4th Infantry Brigade under Brigadier Cedric Edgar. At the same time, aircraft from the Royal Australian Air Force and Royal New Zealand Air Force began bombing Japanese positions around Rabaul; the Japanese, with only a few serviceable aircraft, made no attempt to stop the attacks.

== Battle ==
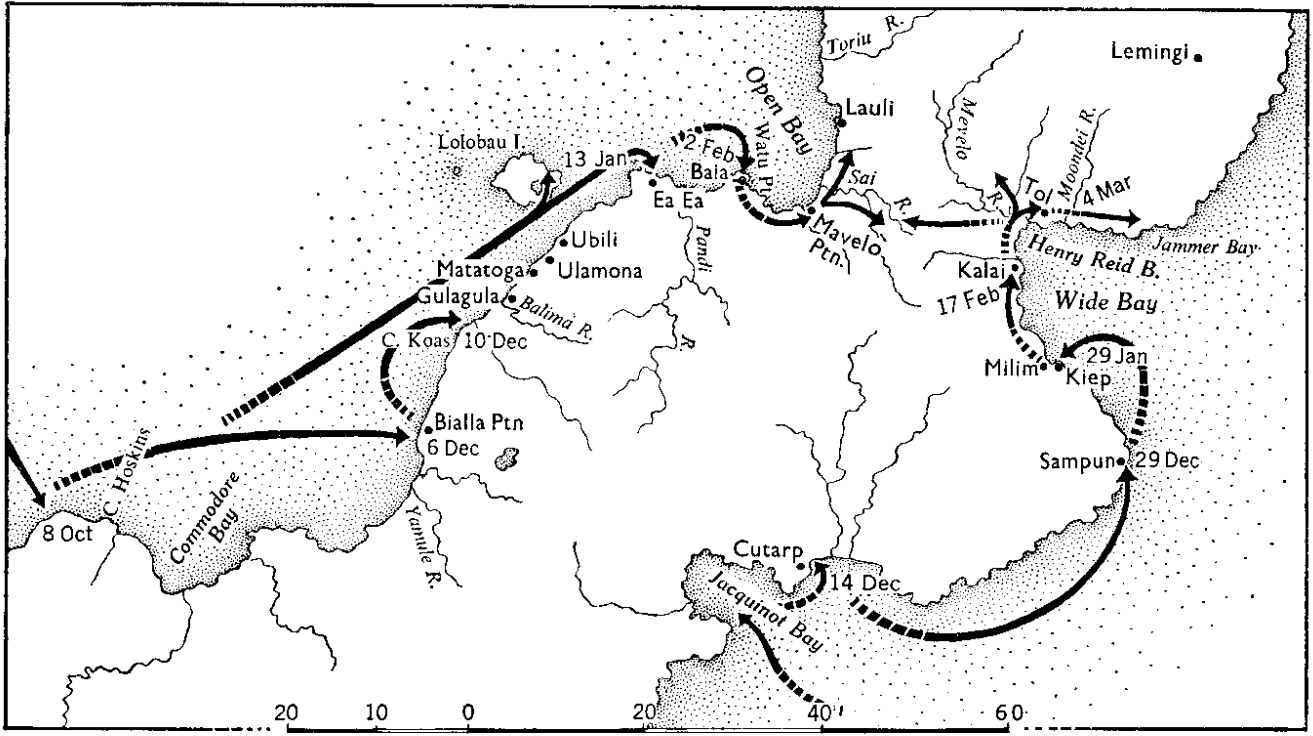
A map of Australian operations in central New Britain between October 1944 and March 1945.

In the first two months following the Australian take over, the Japanese sought to generate some momentum in their operations west of the Gazelle Peninsula, but a number of actions against Australian patrols forced them to withdraw east towards the peninsula. In mid-January 1945, the Australians exploited this withdrawal on the northern coast of New Britain, and the 36th Infantry Battalion advanced overland to Ea Ea, around the western edge of Open Bay, while a small element remained at Cape Hoskins to defend the airfield there. Between January and April 1945 a series of clashes followed and as Australian patrols came to dominate the coast around the bay, the Japanese fell back towards the Turiu River, to the north of the bay, where the swampy ground offered a series of natural obstacles. After advancing to Watu, in line with the western expanse of the bay, the Australians temporarily halted their advance.

Along the southern coast, Royal Australian Navy Fairmile motor launches began patrolling towards Wide Bay shortly before the new year as Japanese submarines had been spotted elsewhere, particularly on the north coast around Open Bay. In late December, two companies from the 14th/32nd Infantry Battalion, reinforced by a platoon from the 1st New Guinea Infantry Battalion, were sent east from Cutarp to Sampun, on the southern expanse of Wide Bay in late December, moving by barge. These forces were bolstered in early January with the arrival of the remaining two companies of the 14th/32nd, along with a troop of artillery from the 2/14th Field Regiment. Between late January and early February 1945, the Australian 6th Infantry Brigade advanced eastwards along the southern coast of New Britain towards Milim, where they established a patrol base with the intention of fanning out towards Henry Reid Bay. Boomerang fighters and Beaufort fighter-bombers attacked Japanese positions to the north of Karlai Plantation on 15 February, and the 14th/32nd subsequently took the position unopposed after the Japanese defenders withdrew under heavy artillery fire. Two days later, the 14th/32nd took the trading station at Kamandram.

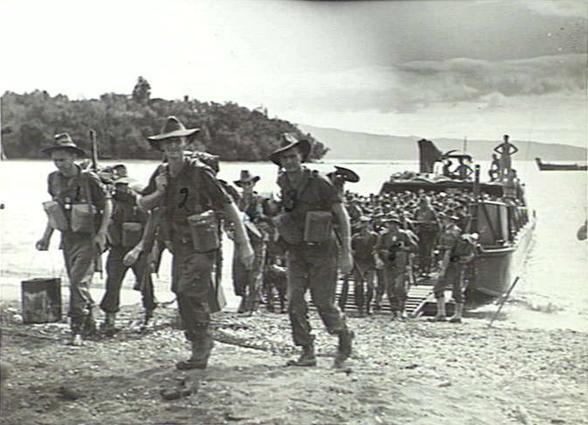
The 16th Infantry Battalion landing at Karlai Plantation, March 1945

In late February, the 19th Infantry Battalion was moved to Gogbulu Creek, where it relieved the 14th/32nd. Elements of the 2/14th Field Regiment established themselves at Karlai Plantation from where they fired support missions across the bay towards Waitavalo. Meanwhile, the 19th Infantry Battalion crossed the Mevelo River and sent patrols eastwards toward the Wulwut River, which flowed into Henry Reid Bay. From Henry Reid Bay, the Australians exploited towards the Kamandram Mission, on the edge of Wide Bay, where the Japanese had earlier established a new defensive line. In mid-February, the two forces clashed for the first time in the area, but the Japanese were unable to check the Australian advance. In early March, the Australian high command ordered an advance towards the coconut plantations at Waitavolo and Tol on the northern edge of Henry Reid Bay. At Tol, the Australians found evidence of a large scale massacre of Australian troops, who had been murdered by troops from the III Battalion, 144th Infantry Regiment in 1942 when the Japanese had captured the island from the Australians. They subsequently exhumed 158 bodies.

Following a crossing of the Wulwut River with engineer support, the 14th/32nd Infantry Battalion took over from the 19th again and from 5 March heavy fighting followed over the course of six weeks as the Australians reduced the fortified Japanese positions on Mount Sugi along a series of ridges west of the river and overlooking the bay. These hills were named "Lone Tree", "Bacon", "Cake", "Young", "Perry's", "Kath's" and "Moose", and were defended by a series of pillboxes, supported by mortars and machine guns. The most significant action was fought around Bacon Hill, which was captured on 18 March by the 14th/32nd Infantry Battalion. The fighting during this period was made more difficult by heavy rains which made the going tough for the infantrymen climbing the steep slopes, while the jeep tracks below upon which the Australians relied for supplies became seas of mud, and the bridge across the Mevelo River was washed away. Japanese planes appeared for the first, and only time, in the campaign in mid-March, with two aircraft dropping several bombs on the bridge over the Wulwut, causing a number of casualties. After Waitavolo was secured, the 36th Infantry Battalion pushed inland and exploited further along the coast, investing Jammer Bay. The 13th Infantry Brigade, elements of which had landed at Karlai Plantation in late March, subsequently took over from the 6th Brigade, and began patrolling operations on the southern coast; while elements of the 4th Infantry Brigade marched north in May.

== Aftermath ==
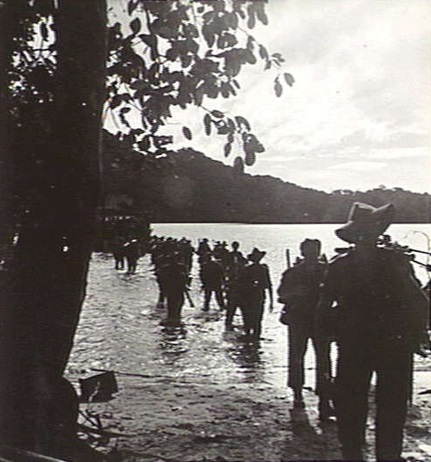
The 37th/52nd Infantry Battalion coming ashore at Open Bay, May 1945

Following the fighting around Wide Bay and Open Bay, the Australian advance essentially came to an end, although limited offensive action continued up until the end of the war. They had effectively secured the island to the west of the Gazelle Peninsula, isolating the 93,000-strong garrison around Rabaul. For the remainder of the war, patrol actions were used to maintain the initiative and hold the defensive line that was established across the island between the two lodgements at Open Bay and Wide Bay; in May, due to shipping shortages, the 37th/52nd Infantry Battalion marched across the island to the Mavelo Plantation from where they were ferried by barge to Open Bay to relieve the 36th Infantry. No further advances were attempted as the Allies focused their main operations elsewhere, such as Borneo and the Philippines. In addition, engineers worked to improve the road system around the secured plantations. Refugees from the Japanese controlled area moved into the Wide Bay and Open Bay areas and were subsequently recruited by the Australian New Guinea Administrative Unit for labouring tasks. Australian operations on the island were constrained by shortages of shipping and air support as these resources were redirected largely to efforts to secure Borneo; these shortages delayed the concentration of the 5th Division considerably and it was not until April that the 5th Division had completed its movements, with the arrival of the 4th and 13th Infantry Brigades being followed by the 2/2nd Commando Squadron.

At the conclusion of hostilities, Australian planners discovered the error that they had made in estimating the size of the Japanese force. They also determined that the force was well provisioned and had ample equipment and ammunition with which to launch a strong counter-attack. Nevertheless, the Japanese commander had chosen not to launch a major counter-offensive, despite heavily outnumbering the Australians as he was under orders to preserve his strength until mutual action could be achieved with the Imperial Japanese Navy, an opportunity that did not eventuate. Battle casualties for the entire campaign for the Australians amounted to 53 killed and 140 wounded, with another 21 dying from other causes; Japanese casualties on the south coast up to April were reported by Australian sources as 138 killed, while 68 were killed on the northern coast in the same time. Five prisoners were also taken. Considered a "classic containment campaign", the 5th Division had been able to successfully contain a much larger Japanese force.

== See also ==
- Shigeru Mizuki, a Japanese soldier who participated in the battle and wrote about it in Onward Towards Our Noble Deaths and Showa: A History of Japan.
