= Henry Reid Bay =

- Homhovulu Harbor
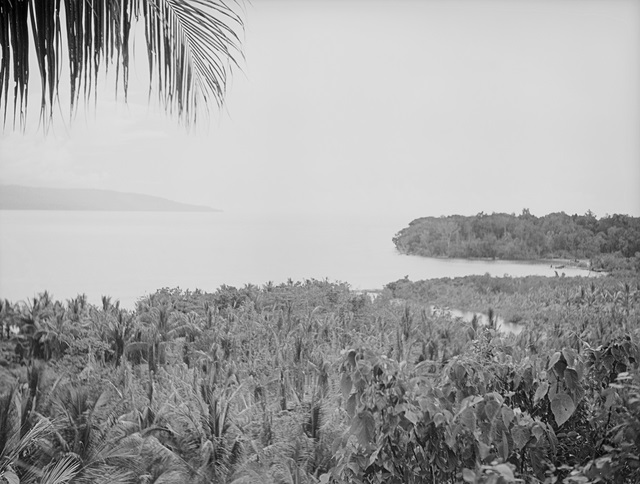
- Henry Reid Bay viewed from Kamandran, February 1945

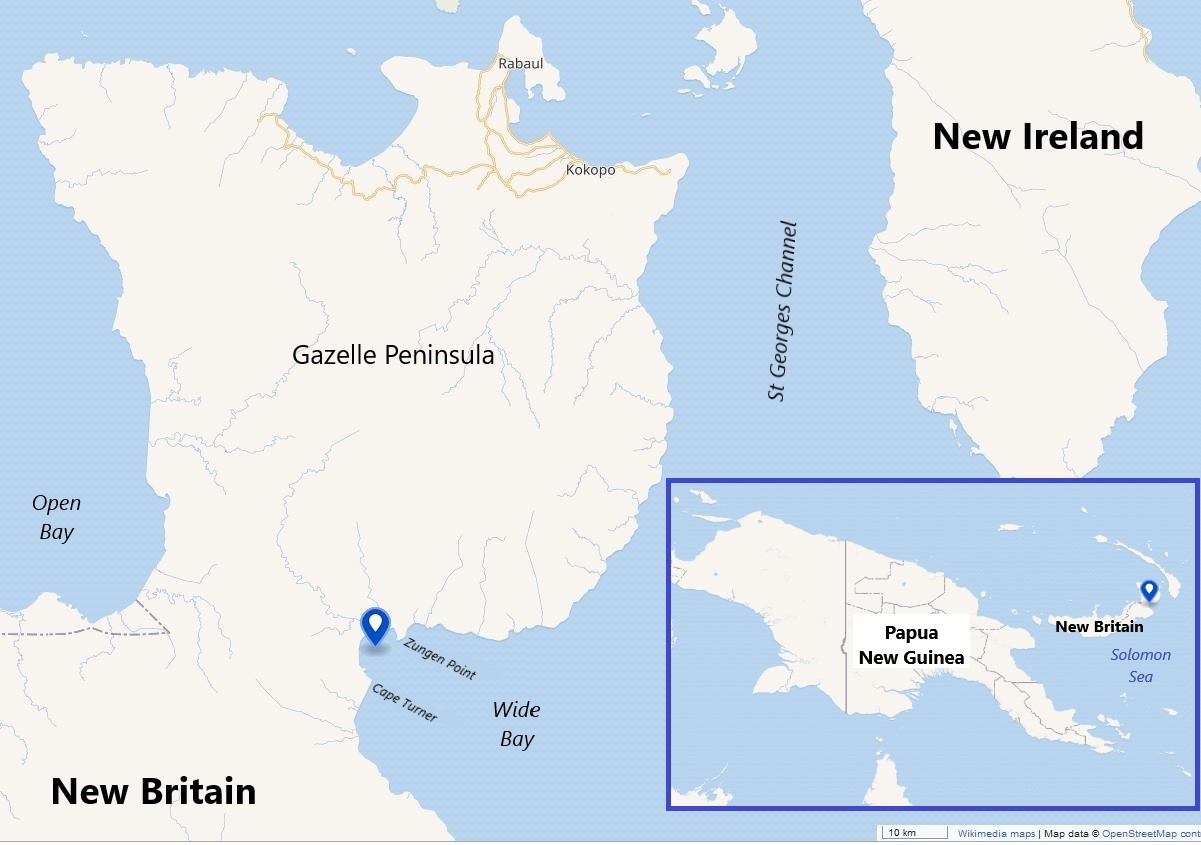

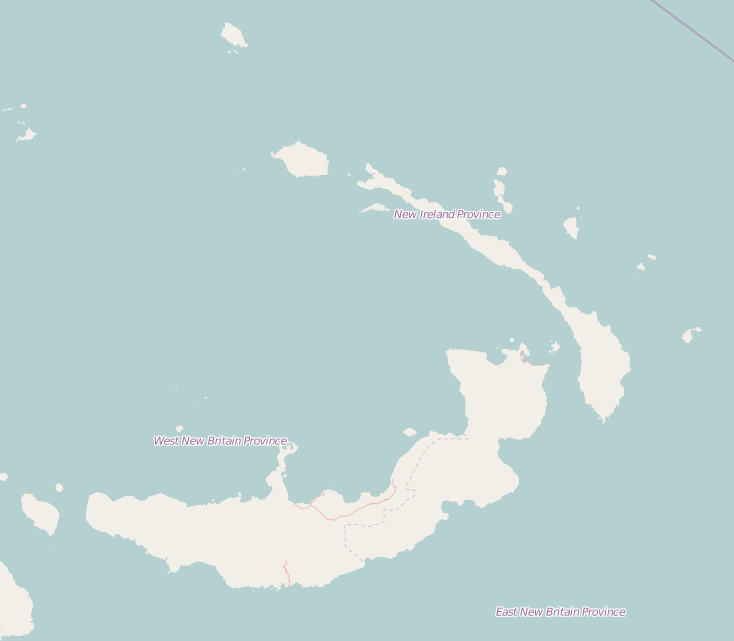
- Location within New Britain

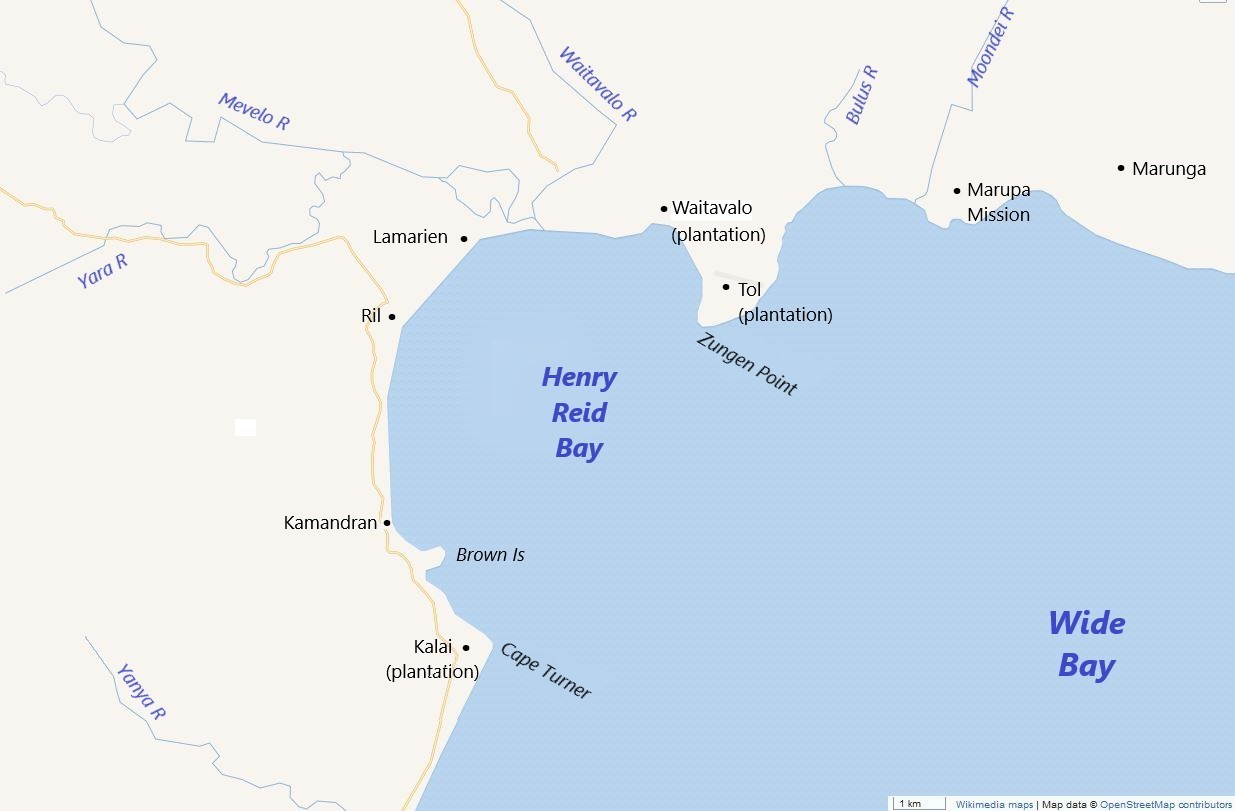
- Map of Henry Reid Bay (adapted from Open Street Map, 2018)
- Location: East New Britain Province
- Coordinates: 5°0′2.1″S 151°58′27.4″E
- Etymology: In honour of Henry Reed
- Part of: Wide Bay
- River sources: Mevelo River; Waitavalo River
- Ocean/sea sources: Coral Sea
- Basin countries: Papua New Guinea
- Islands: Brown Island (now joined to mainland)

Henry Reid Bay (sometimes Henry Reed Bay) is known locally as Homhovulu Harbor. It is a bay on the southerly coast of New Britain that opens into Wide Bay. It forms the furthest penetration of Wide Bay and is defined by Zungen Point on its north shore and Cape Turner on its southern shore. Wide Bay and Open Bay, on the northerly coast, form the isthmus separating the Gazelle Peninsula from the western part of the island.

== Etymology ==
The bay was named by the Methodist missionary George Brown for his benefactor, the Tasmanian philanthropist, Henry Reed.

== Geography ==
Henry Reid Bay is in the East New Britain Province of Papua New Guinea. It opens into Wide Bay, which, in turn, opens into the Coral Sea.

Zungen Point, which bounds the bay to the north, is from the German word for tongues. It may be identified as Tongue Point. Cape Turner, bounding the bay to the south, may be identified as South Point.

Brown Island, northwest of Cape Turner, has been joined to the mainland by a causeway but continues to be identified as an island.

Several rivers discharge into the bay. The main system is the Mevelo, which has several tributaries – a number of which confluence near the mouth. Mapping from the Second World War shows the Powell River as a tributary of the Mevelo with the confluence approximately 8 kilometres (5.0 mi) inland from the mouth. However, the Danish explorer and anthropologist, Richard Parkinson, indicates that the main stream identified herein as the Mavelo, is the Powell and that it is otherwise known as the Mävlu.

The second main river is the Waitavalo. It is also known as the Henry Reid River, the Wulwut or Vulvut (which would be the phonetic spelling of the German pronunciation). Cartography from the Second World War show that the two river systems enter the bay nearby each other but at distinctly different points. However, recent imagery shows that the Waitavalo has moved, such that the mouth of the two systems is indistinguishable.

Several coconut palm plantations for harvesting copra had been developed around the bay prior to the Second World War – at Tol, Waitavalo and Kalai. Kalai was also the site of a Roman Catholic Mission.

An airfield was constructed at Tol by the 2/3 Railway Construction Company of the Australian Army in early August 1945. Its present status is described as disused but serviceable. A recent report by the Global Disaster Alert and Coordination System indicates it remains in service. The report also lists Lamarien and Marupa Mission as minor population centres (small villages) in the immediate vicinity.

== Ethnography ==
Historically, peoples from two distinct tribal language groups are reported to have occupied the vicinity of the bay and the greater region of Wide Bay. According to Parkinson, the Gaktei tribal group, originally from the mountains of the Gazelle isthmus, were in a state of "feud" with the Sulka people. The latter had been dislocated from Henry Reid Bay toward the south and Cape Orford. The Linguist, Peter Lanyon-Orgill, describes the Sulka language as Papuan in origin and the Gaktei as being Melonesian and associated with Henry Reid Bay.

Brown recounts his visit to Henry Reid Bay in January 1878, noting that the inhabitants were significantly different in appearance and culture from those encountered in an earlier visit. He observed evidence that the previous occupants had been recently and violently dislocated from the area.

== World War Two ==
=== Massacres at Tol Plantation ===
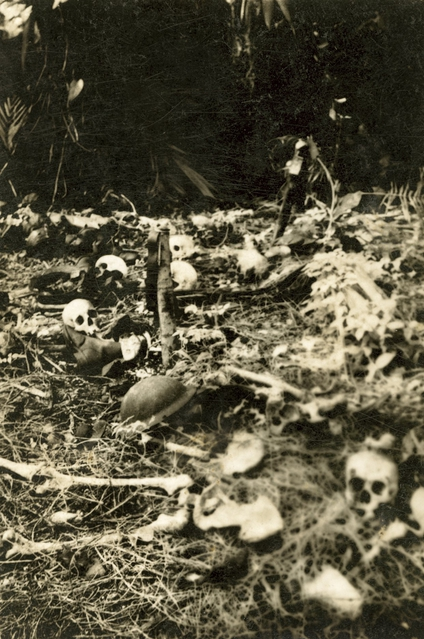
Scattered remains of victims of the Tol massacres discovered by Australian troops c. March 1945

Organised defence of Rabaul by Lark Force ceased soon after the Japanese landings there on 23 January 1942. Many of the survivors attempted to escape capture by withdrawing along either the north or the south coasts in small groups.

In the morning of 3 February, five barges of Japanese troops landed near Tol Plantation. This force was drawn from the 3rd battalion of the 144th Infantry Regiment (3/144th). Twenty-two personnel elected to surrender to the Japanese under a white flag. Others attempted to evade capture but many were caught as the Japanese searched the area around Henry Reid Bay. Other parties were captured as they approached Tol. On the next day, the prisoners were killed in four separate events, numbering about 100, 6, 24 and 11. Not all of those killed were military personnel. A number of the military personnel were from the 2/10th Field Ambulance, and wearing red-cross arm-bands. A small number survived the massacres, mainly by feigning death after being shot and/or bayoneted. Bodies were covered with palm fronds by the Japanese. A number were also reported to have been burnt to death. The Australian official history has extracts of accounts from two survivors and the finding of a court of inquiry convened in May 1942.

Then in March 1945, the Australian 14th/32nd Battalion conducted operations against Japanese positions near Waitavalo and Tol. The scattered remains of 158 victims of the massacre were discovered and subsequently interred. The Australian War Memorial gives the number of victims as approximately 160.

Neither Major General Tomitarō Horii, commanding the South Seas Detachment, the force tasked with the capture of Rabaul; nor, Lieutenant Colonel Genichiro Kuwada, commanding the 3/144th, survived the war. Colonel Masao Kusunose, commanding the 144th Regiment, was interrogated by war crimes investigators at Tokyo after the surrender of Japan. He escaped custody and committed suicide by starvation. No prosecution has been made in respect to these killings.

In May 1987, a memorial consisting of a rock cairn and brass plaque, was erected at Tol by members of the 3rd Brigade of the Australian Army.

=== Battle of Wide Bay–Open Bay ===
With a base area secured at Jacquinot Bay, the Australian 6th Brigade commenced operations toward the northerly end of the Gazelle isthmus to establish a containment line there. The Japanese had developed a strong position on the heights above the Waitavelo and Tol plantations following a ridge line, rising from near the mouth of the Waitavelo River and running to the northeast. A crossing of the Waitavelo River was made by the 19th Battalion on 5 March 1945. The 19th and 14th/32nd Battalions conducted a series of attacks until the position was secured on 20 March. The area was then used as a base for patrol operations until the end of the war.
