= Henry Reed (merchant) =

- Born: 28 December 1806; Doncaster, England
- Died: 10 October 1880 (aged 73); Mount Pleasant, Tasmania
- Education: Apprentice
- Occupations: Merchant, landowner, philanthropist and evangelist
- Spouse(s): Maria Susanna Grubb (1st), Margaret Sayres Elizabeth Frith (2nd)
- Children: 11 with first wife, 5 with second
- Parent(s): Samuel Reed and Mary Reed née Rockliff
- Relatives: Hudson Fysh (grandson); Cynthia Nolan (granddaughter); John Reed (grandson)

Henry Reed (28 December 1806 – 10 October 1880) was an Australian landowner, shipowner, merchant, philanthropist and evangelist.

== Early life and work ==
Reed was born at Doncaster, England, on 28 December 1806 to postmaster Samuel Reed (1773-1813) and his wife Mary, née Rockcliff. When 13, Henry was apprenticed to a merchant at Hull. He left Britain as a steerage passenger on the Tiger, reaching Hobart in April 1827.

He travelled north to Launceston where he found work in the store of John Gleadow. In January 1828, he received a land grant of 640 acres (259 ha) at Nile riverlet. Other land acquisitions soon followed.

He left Gleadow's employment and established himself as a general merchant. He also began to buy ships, that he employed in trading and whaling voyages. Five vessels he owned made 18 whaling voyages between 1834 and 1855.

Among his associates in Tasmania at this time were James Henty, John Batman and William Buckley.

He returned to Britain in 1831, where he married his cousin, Mary Grubb. While there he also formed a business relationship with Henry Buckle & Co. that later helped advance his commercial career.

Back in Tasmania by 1832, he plunged again into commerce, importing sugar from Mauritius, and sending his whaling ships to sea.

=== Later life ===
Reed's wife died in 1860; she had borne him eleven children. In 1863 he married Margaret Sayres Elizabeth Frith of Enniskillen, Ireland, an ardent church worker, by whom he had five children. He helped William Booth, founder of the Salvation Army, with money and advice in the difficult formative years of the organisation. Generous gifts were also made to other evangelical work such as the China Inland Mission and the East London Christian Mission. He compiled The Pioneer Hymn Book (London, 1870) and published two tracts, 'Be filled with the spirit' and 'Incidents in an eventful life', Dunorlan Tracts, 1-2 (London, 1873).

In April 1873, with his family and attendants, he sailed for Launceston where he bought and made Mount Pleasant the finest house in northern Tasmania and developed Wesley Dale. In 1875, he helped Rev. George Brown to establish the New Guinea Mission and bought for it the steam launch Henry Reed. In New Britain Brown named Henry Reed Bay in his honour. In Launceston he bought Parr's Hotel in Wellington Street in order to replace it with a mission church, which was completed in 1885 after his death as the Henry Reed Memorial Christian Mission Church, as were the nearby Dunorlan Cottages to provide free housing for elderly indigent women.
