= 37th/52nd Battalion (Australia) =

Australian infantry battalion

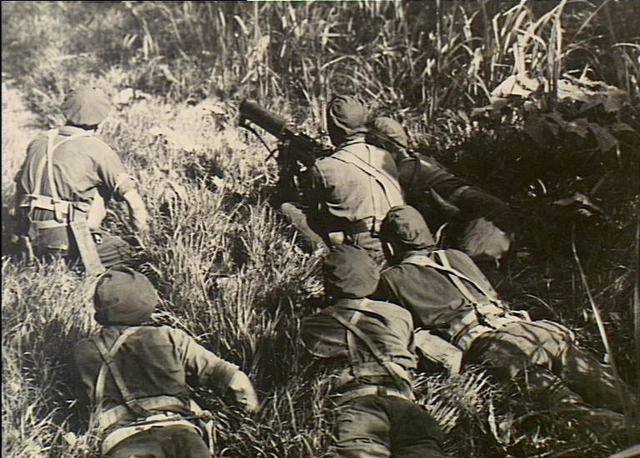
- A machine-gun crew from the 37th/52nd Battalion in New Guinea, 1944
- Active: 1930–37; 1942–46
- Country: Australia
- Branch: Australian Army
- Type: Infantry
- Size: ~800–900 all ranks (Note: By the start of World War II, the authorised strength of an Australian infantry battalion was 910 men all ranks; however, later in the war it fell to 803 when the jungle divisional establishment was adopted.)
- Part of: 4th Brigade, 5th Division
- Garrison/HQ: Henty, Victoria
- Nickname: Henty Regiment
- Colours: Black over red
- Engagements: World War II: Huon Peninsula campaign; New Britain campaign

Insignia
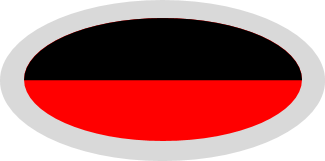
- Unit colour patch

The 37th/52nd Battalion was an infantry battalion of the Australian Army. Formed in 1930 from two previously existing Militia battalions, the battalion remained on the Australian order of battle until 1937. During World War II it was revived in 1942 and subsequently saw active service with the 4th Brigade against the Japanese in the Huon Peninsula and New Britain campaigns. It was disbanded after the war in 1946.

== History ==
The 37th/52nd Battalion was formed in the state of Victoria in 1930 as part of a rationalisation of Australia's part-time military forces that came about as a result of the combined effects of the suspension of compulsory service by the newly elected Scullin Labor government and the Great Depression; its predecessor units were the 37th and 52nd Battalions. Upon establishment, the unit adopted the territorial designation of the "Henty Regiment". The battalion remained in existence until 1937 when, as part of an expansion of the Australian military due to concerns about the threat of war in Europe, the battalion was split to reform its predecessor units.

In August 1942, during World War II, the battalion was re-raised when it was decided to disband a number of Militia forces in response to a manpower shortage in the Australian economy that had been brought about by an over mobilisation of Australia's military forces. Initially, the battalion was assigned to the 10th Brigade and attached to the 3rd Division, however, it was later transferred to the 4th Brigade in September 1942, where it joined the 29th/46th and 22nd Battalions. After a year of training in Queensland, in March 1943, the battalion was deployed to Milne Bay along with the rest of the 4th Brigade, which was assigned to the 5th Division—newly converted to the Jungle establishment—at the time.

After undertaking further jungle warfare training and serving as garrison troops loading and unloading ships, the 37th/52nd Battalion, along with the rest of the 4th Brigade, was detached to the 9th Division to provide support during the Huon Peninsula campaign. Tasked with taking over responsibility for defending the beachhead from the 20th Brigade, they arrived in early September 1943. After defending Red Beach and supporting the capture of Lae the battalion received a cadre of experienced 2nd Australian Imperial Force personnel as reinforcements as they began to prepare to undertake a more offensive role. Between December 1943 and April 1944, the battalion carried out long range patrolling operations behind the mission at Sattelberg, which had been captured in November.

When the Australian advance towards Sio resumed in December, the 4th Brigade was tasked with moving up the coast from Gusika to Lakona. In the process they captured Fortification Point and landed on Karkar Island, before garrisoning Madang in April. They remained there until August and the following month the 37th/52nd was withdrawn back to Australia for rest and reorganisation.

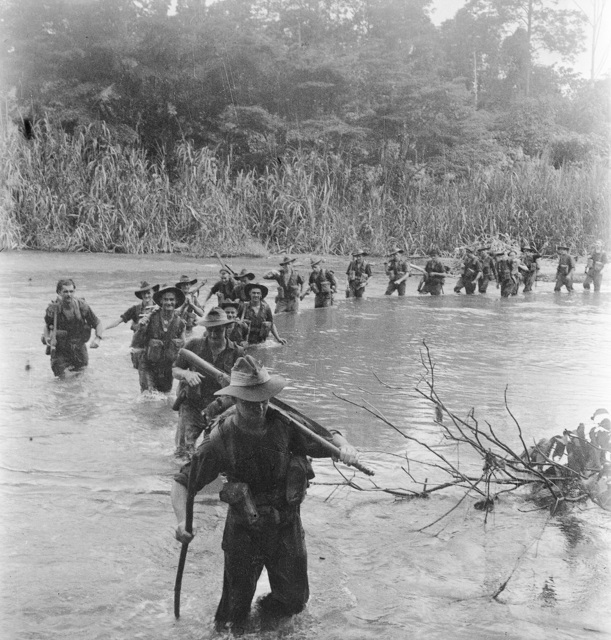
Soldiers of the 37th/52nd Battalion's A Company crossing a river in the Open Bay area of New Britain during May 1945

After training at Strathpine, Queensland, the battalion was deployed to New Britain. Originally it had been intended that they would be deployed earlier to reinforce the units of the 6th and 13th Brigades, however, a shortage of shipping delayed the movement of the 4th Brigade. As a result, they did not arrive until January 1945, landing at Wunung Bay. By that time the campaign on the island had devolved into mainly a holding action and as a result the 37th/52nd remained at Wunung Bay, largely occupying itself with conducting jungle training. Some patrols were undertaken, however, and in May the battalion relieved the 36th Battalion at Open Bay, where they engaged in combat with the Japanese.

In August 1945 the war came to an end and following this the 4th Brigade was moved to Rabaul to guard Japanese prisoners of war and restore law and order. As the demobilisation process began, members of the 37th/52nd were repatriated to Australia for discharge, while others were transferred to other units for subsequent service. Slowly the battalion's frontage was reduced to the point where, on 12 June 1946, the battalion was disbanded.

During the course of its involvement in the war, the 37th/52nd Battalion lost 30 men killed in action or died on active service, while a further 35 were wounded. Members of the battalion received the following decorations: one Distinguished Conduct Medal, one Military Medal and 10 Mentions in Despatches.

== Alliances ==
- United Kingdom – Queen's Own Cameron Highlanders.

== Battle honours ==
The 37th/52nd received the following battle honours for its service during the war:

- Capture of Lae; South-West Pacific 1942–1945; Liberation of Australian New Guinea and Gusika–Fortification Point.

== Notes ==
Footnotes

Citations
