= 594th Engineer Boat and Shore Regiment =

- Active: 1943–1946
- Country: United States
- Branch: United States Army Corps of Engineers
- Type: Engineer battalion
- Part of: 4th Engineer Special Brigade
- Engagements: New Guinea campaign New Britain campaign Philippines campaign

The 594th Boat and Shore Regiment was a military engineer unit in the United States Army. The regiment served during World War II and was also known as the 594th Engineer Amphibian Regiment.

== History ==
The 594th Boat and Shore Regiment was activated as the 594th Engineer Amphibian Regiment at Fort Devens, Massachusetts on 1 February 1943, as part of the 4th Engineer Special Brigade.
