= Wide Bay, Papua New Guinea =

Bay in Papua New Guinea

Coordinates: 5.083°S 152.083°E

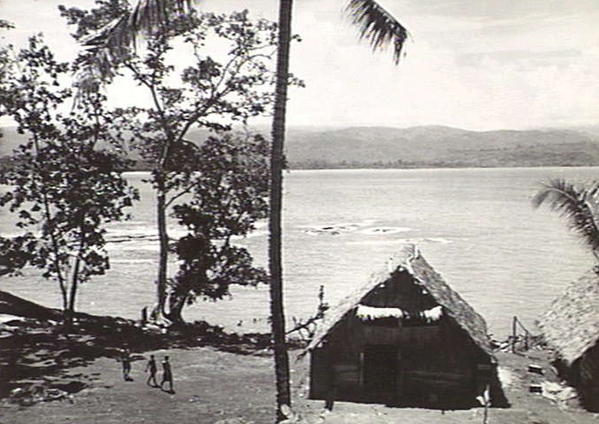
Wide Bay WWII

Wide Bay is a bay located to the south of Rabaul, on the southern coast of Gazelle Peninsula of New Britain.

During the final stages of World War II, after landing at Jacquinot Bay Australian forces then established a defensive line across the island between Wide Bay and Open Bay during the Battle of Wide Bay–Open Bay in 1945, with the aim of confining the Japanese forces on the island to the area around Rabaul.
