= 19th Battalion (Australia) =

Australian Army infantry battalion

19th Battalion 19th Battalion, Royal New South Wales Regiment
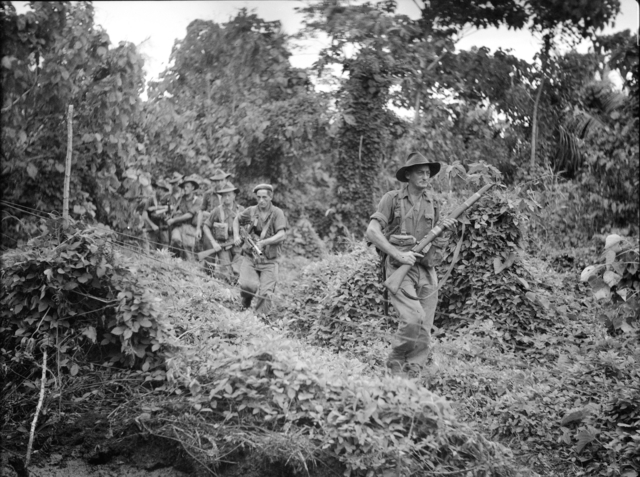
- A patrol from the 19th Battalion around the Waitavalo Plantation, on New Britain, March 1945
- Active: 1860–1930; 1941–1945; 1966–1971
- Country: Australia
- Branch: Australian Army
- Type: Infantry
- Size: ~800–1,000 men (Note: During World War I, the authorised strength of an Australian infantry battalion was 1,023 men. By the start of World War II, it was 910 men all ranks, however, later in the war it fell to 803.)
- Part of: 5th Brigade; 9th Brigade; 6th Brigade
- Mottos: Fortiter et Fideliter (Boldly and Faithfully)
- Colours: Brown over green
- Engagements: World War I: Gallipoli campaign; Western Front; World War II: New Guinea campaign; New Britain campaign

Insignia
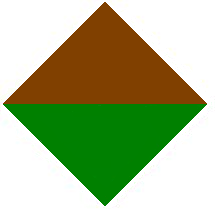
- Unit colour patch

The 19th Battalion was an infantry battalion of the Australian Army. Although the unit's numerical designation was bestowed upon it during World War I, the unit can trace its origins back to 1860 when a Volunteer Rifle corps was raised in South Sydney. During World War I, the 19th Battalion was raised as a unit of the Australian Imperial Force, attached to the 5th Brigade, of the 2nd Division. The unit was formed in 1915 and was first sent to Gallipoli where it fought against the Turks, before being withdrawn from the peninsula and being sent to France in early 1916, where it served in the trenches along the Western Front. Over the next two years the battalion fought in many major battles and won numerous battle honours. In April 1918, it took part in defending against the German Spring Offensive, before the Allies launched their own last-ditch effort as part of the Hundred Days Offensive. The battalion was disbanded in October 1918 due to manpower shortages in the AIF and most of its men were sent to reinforce the other three battalions of the 5th Brigade.

In 1921, the 19th Battalion was reformed as part of the Citizens Forces (later the "Militia"), becoming known as the 19th Battalion (The South Sydney Regiment). From 1930 the battalion was linked with the 1st Battalion to form the 1st/19th Battalion (City of Sydney's Own Regiment), before being linked with the 20th Battalion. During World War II the battalion initially served in the defence of Darwin before being delinked from the 20th Battalion in 1941 and deployed in New Guinea and New Britain. In 1945, the battalion was disbanded and was not reformed until 1966 when it was re-raised as part of the Citizens Military Force, serving as a special conditions battalion known as the 19th Battalion, Royal New South Wales Regiment. The battalion would maintain a similar role until 1995, although in 1971 it would be amalgamated with the 1st Battalion once more to form the 1st/19th Battalion, Royal New South Wales Regiment.

== History ==
=== Early origins ===
Like many Australian infantry battalions, the 19th Battalion's lineage is a complex one. As a result of a series of re-organisations, the battalion can trace its origins to 1860 when a corps of volunteers was raised in the southern suburbs of Sydney becoming known as "South Sydney's Own", a part of the military forces of the New South Wales colonial defence force. In 1903, following the Federation of Australia, this unit became part of the Commonwealth Military Forces and was subsumed into the 1st Australian Infantry Regiment.

In 1912, a system of compulsory military service was introduced and the unit was renamed the 21st Infantry, and then later, in 1915, the 22nd Infantry. This scheme greatly expanded the army, however, when World War I began, due to the provisions of the Defence Act (1903) which precluded sending conscripts overseas to fight, it became necessary to raise an all volunteer force, separate to the home military force – the Citizens Forces – for service in the Middle East and Europe.

=== World War I ===
This force was known as the Australian Imperial Force (AIF). As a part of this, the 19th Battalion was raised in March 1915, in Liverpool, New South Wales, drawing some of its personnel from men who had already served with the Australian Naval and Military Expeditionary Force. Upon establishment the battalion was assigned to the 5th Brigade, which was part of the 2nd Division. After completing basic training in Australia, the battalion was dispatched to Egypt where further training was undertaken. Later, the battalion was sent to Anzac Cove as part of a wave of reinforcements that were sent to the peninsula following the initial landing, arriving there on 21 August 1915. Following that, it took part in the attack on Battle of Hill 60, during which it was dispatched to the Azmak Dere, where a gap had formed following the British 11th Division's withdrawal amidst confused fighting.

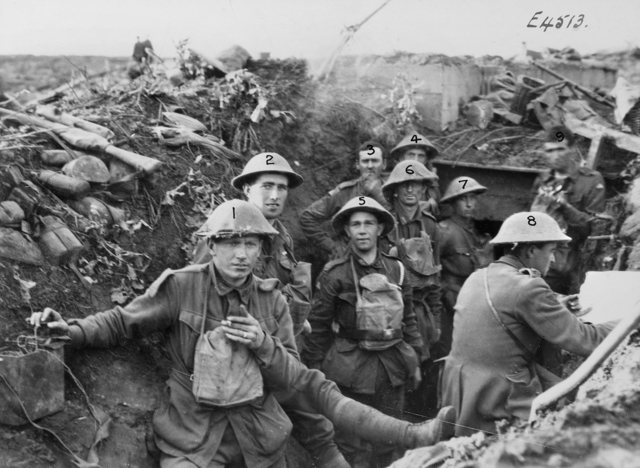
Australian soldiers, including a runner from the 19th Battalion, at Broodseinde Ridge, October 1917

After this, the battalion was mainly employed in the defence of Pope's Hill, until it was withdrawn on 19 December 1915. It returned to Egypt and was involved in the defence of the Suez Canal zone in the early months of 1916. The battalion was then sent to France. Arriving there on 22 March 1916, the battalion moved to the Armentières area for familiarisation of trench warfare procedures on the Western Front, a completely different style of warfare to that encountered on Gallipoli. In July 1916, as part of the 2nd Division's relief of the 1st Division, the battalion arrived at Pozières, where it took part in the Battle of Pozières. In November 1916, following a period of respite in a quieter sector in Belgium, the 19th Battalion involved in an attack on a trench system known as "the Maze" near Flers, suffered devastating losses in winter conditions that were described as the "worst ever encountered by the AIF".

In 1917, the 19th Battalion was involved in the attack on German forces after their retreat to the Hindenburg Line. The battalion also took part in three other major battles in 1917, Second Bullecourt, Menin Road and Poelcappelle in Belgium. In 1918 the battalion helped to repel the German spring offensive, and it was during this time, on 7 April 1918, that Lieutenant Percy Storkey earned a Victoria Cross for his actions during the fighting in Hangard Wood. Following this, the battalion took part in the Allied offensive that eventually brought about the end of the war, fighting around Amiens and Mont St Quentin before coming up against the "Beaurevoir Line" at Estrees on 3–4 October 1918. This engagement was the battalion's last combat operation in the war, as the whole of 2nd Division was withdrawn from the line after the 6th Brigade's attack on Montbrehain on 5–6 October. On 10 October 1918, while resting near Vignacourt, the 19th Battalion was disbanded to reinforce other battalions in the 5th Brigade. (Note: In late 1918, as a result of the combined effects of high casualties suffered during the German spring offensive, long-term leave that was granted for 1914 enlistees and the reduced numbers of new enlistments, the AIF was forced to reduce the number of battalions per brigade from four to three. Seven infantry battalions were disbanded at this time; three battalions had already been disbanded in May 1918 for the same reasons.)

During the war, the battalion suffered 2,903 casualties. There are 874 names of 19th Battalion personnel killed in action recorded on the Australian War Memorial (AWM) Roll of Honour. Members of the 19th Battalion received the following decorations: one Victoria Cross, five Distinguished Service Orders (DSOs), one Officer of the Order of the British Empire (OBE), 20 Distinguished Conduct Medals (DCMs), 31 Military Crosses (MCs), 90 Military Medals (MMs), eight Meritorious Service Medals (MSMs) and 19 Mentions in Despatches (MIDs). (Note: The Australian War Memorial also states that there were six foreign awards, but does not list them. Matthews & Wilson have identified these awards which are shown with full details of recipients in their book's accompanying Research CD-ROM under "Decorations": one Order of St Stanislaus, 3rd Class, with Swords; one Croix de Guerre (France); two Croix de Guerre (Belgium); one Médaille Militaire (France) and one Bronze Medal for Military Valour ('Al Valore') (Italy).) (Note: This list has been put together using AWM figures, however, it differs slightly in so much as where a Bar was awarded, that is included in the figures. As such, there were 29 individuals who received the MC from the 19th Battalion, with two Bars. There were also 85 individuals who received the MM, with five Bars.) For its war service, the battalion was awarded 20 battle honours. The battalion's honour roll and the original cross which was erected over its dead at Pozieres are to be found in St Luke's Anglican Church in Arden Street, Clovelly, in Sydney.

=== Inter-war years ===
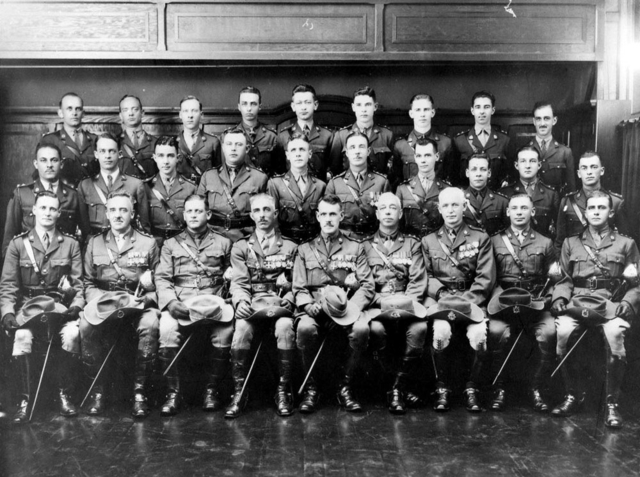
Officers from the 1st/19th Battalion, November 1932

Shortly before the end of World War I, Australia's home military force was re-organised into multi-battalion regiments, with each regiment being formed to perpetuate the numerical designations of the AIF battalions that had been raised from personnel drawn from their geographical area. In April 1921, following a review of Australia's defence requirements as the demobilisation process came to an end, the AIF was officially disbanded and the decision was made to reorganise the units of the Citizens Forces to perpetuate the designations and battle honours of the AIF battalions; this saw the multi-battalion regiments disbanded and single battalions being formed. As a result, the 2nd Battalion, 19th Infantry Regiment, a unit that could trace its lineage back to 1860, was reformed as the 19th Battalion, perpetuating both the lineage of its predecessor Citizens Forces units and that of its associated AIF unit.

In 1927, the unit adopted the territorial designation of "The South Sydney Regiment". At the same time the motto Fortiter et Fideliter (Boldly and Faithfully) was authorised. The battalion was assigned to the 9th Brigade, 2nd Division, upon its re-establishment. Initially, the Citizens Force was maintained through a system of compulsory service, however, in 1929–30, after the election of the Scullin Labor government, the Citizens Force was reorganised as the "Militia", and was maintained on a volunteer only basis. Throughout the 1930s, as a result of manpower shortages and the austerity measures that resulted from the economic hardships of the Great Depression, the unit was amalgamated with the 1st Battalion. In 1939, these two battalions were delinked, however, the 19th was further amalgamated with the 20th Battalion to form the 20th/19th Battalion, adopting the territorial designation of the "Parramatta and Blue Mountains Regiment".

=== World War II ===
At the start of World War II, the 20th/19th Battalion served as a machine-gun unit in Sydney before part of it was sent to Darwin to serve as a garrison force in 1941. The machine gunners later formed part of the 6th Machine Gun Battalion. Meanwhile, Darwin's regular garrison – the Darwin Mobile Force – was disbanded and as a consequence the battalion received a cadre of experience regular former non-commissioned officers who were subsequently commissioned. Initially, this force was known as the Darwin Infantry Battalion, but from 1 November 1941 the title of the 19th Battalion was readopted with the unit having separated from the 20th. During their time as part of the Darwin garrison, the 19th provided a significant part of the Army's contribution to the defence of the town against Japanese attacks; they remained there until September 1942 when they were relieved by troops from the 10th/48th Battalion, which had been transferred from the New South Wales south coast.

After their relief, the 19th was transported to Mt Isa and then flown back to Narellan where the troops were given a long period of leave. Upon reconstitution in October, the battalion was re-equipped and a period of training around the Nepean River followed. Consisting of about 750 personnel, the 19th was reassigned to the 28th Brigade, along with the 20th and 34th Battalions. In November, the 19th moved to a training camp near Newcastle where they received amphibious training alongside US personnel to become a demonstration unit for the Joint Overseas Operational Training School. Afterwards, the battalion moved to Woodford, Queensland, where jungle training was undertaken. In April 1943, the 19th Battalion moved to Gordonvale and was reassigned to the 6th Brigade. In July it deployed to the Buna area in New Guinea where it was used on defensive duties carrying out patrols and providing labour for work parties. In late May 1944, the battalion was transported aboard the Duntroon to Lae, establishing itself around Buolo.

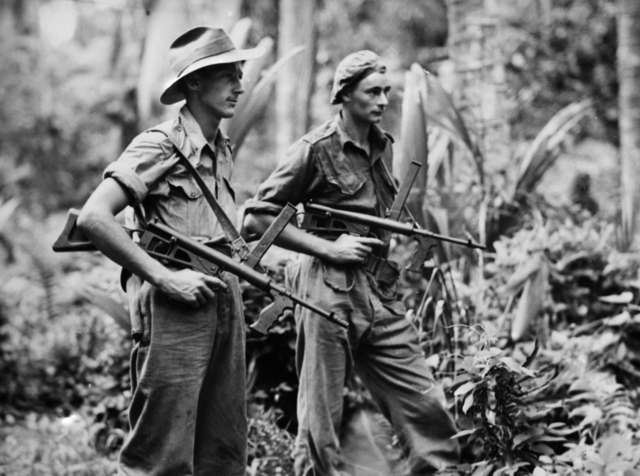
Members of the 19th Battalion on New Britain, 4 April 1945

In December 1944, the battalion was sent to New Britain, embarking upon the transport Francis J. Parkman, and over the course of the next five months they undertook a campaign of harassment operations to keep the large number of Japanese forces stationed there off balance. (Note: Initially Allied intelligence estimated Japanese forces on New Britain in late 1944 at around 38,000 men. However, following the conclusion of hostilities in 1945, it was discovered that this estimate was widely inaccurate with over 69,000 Japanese occupying the Gazelle Peninsula alone.) Using barges to advance up the coast towards the Gazelle Peninsula, the 19th Battalion relieved the 14th/32nd Battalion and on 28 February 1945 crossed the Mevelo River, whereupon they began advancing towards the Wulwut River. At this point they came up against the forward Japanese defensive positions that had been dug-in along the Waitavalo ridge, which lay behind the Wulwut and overlooked the Waitavalo and Tol plantations. On 5 March, the 19th attempted to cross the river, but was initially turned back by intense Japanese mortar and machine-gun fire. A second attempt later in the day was successful, however.

After this, the 19th subsequently captured a number of Japanese positions before moving on to Bacon Hill, the crest of the ridge where the main Japanese defensive position was located. At this point they were relieved by the 14th/32nd Battalion. After the 14th/32nd captured Bacon Hill further patrols were sent inland and towards Jammer Bay via the coast. The Australians subsequently secured a position along a line between Wide Bay and Open Bay, at which point they changed to a defensive posture, designed to keep the Japanese bottled up on the Gazelle Peninsula. As a result, the battalion took no further part in major offensive operations. Throughout the fighting on New Britain, the 19th Battalion suffered 64 battle casualties, which consisted of seven officers and 57 other ranks. In April 1945, the battalion was brought back to Australia to prepare for further operations. In July, however, as it became clear that the war was about to end the 19th was disbanded as it became surplus to Australia's military requirements. During the course of the war the battalion suffered a total of 69 casualties, of which 18 were killed in action or died on active service. Members of the battalion received the following decorations for their service: one OBE, four MCs, two MMs and 13 MIDs. The 19th Battalion was awarded three battle honours for its service during World War II; in 1961, it was also entrusted with the four battle honours that the 2/19th Battalion had received for its service during the Malayan Campaign and the Fall of Singapore.

=== Post World War II ===
Following the end of the war even though the Citizens Military Force (CMF) was reformed in 1948, the battalion was not re-raised at the time. The CMF had been reformed on a restricted establishment and as a result the unit remained off the order of battle until 1966 when the 19th Battalion was re-raised as the 19th Battalion, Royal New South Wales Regiment, a special conditions battalion, assigned at divisional level to provide training for national servicemen and volunteers who were unable to meet their training obligations due to their residence in isolated areas. The battalion continued to fulfil a similar role until 1995, although in 1971 it was amalgamated with the 1st Battalion once more to form the 1st/19th Battalion, Royal New South Wales Regiment, an Australian Army Reserve unit that remains in existence today and perpetuates the honours and traditions of both the 1st and 19th Battalions and their predecessor units.

== Battle honours ==
The 19th Battalion was awarded the following battle honours:

- World War I: Suvla, Gallipoli 1915–16, Egypt 1915–16, Somme 1916–18, Pozières, Bapaume 1917, Bullecourt, Ypres 1917, Menin Road, Polygon Wood, Broodseinde, Poelcappelle, Passchendaele, Hamel, Amiens, Albert 1918, Mont St Quentin, Hindenburg Line, Beaurevoir, France and Flanders 1916–1918.
- World War II: South-West Pacific 1945, Waitavolo, Liberation of Australian New Guinea.

== Lineage ==
1860–1862 – 1st Regiment New South Wales Rifle Volunteers (The South Sydney Volunteer Corps)
1862–1868 – The Sydney Battalion New South Wales Volunteer Rifles
1868–1876 – The Suburban Battalion New South Wales Volunteer Rifles
1876–1878 – 1st Regiment New South Wales Volunteer Infantry
1878–1901 – 2nd Regiment Volunteer Rifles
1901–1903 – 1st Infantry Regiment
1903–1908 – 1st Australian Infantry Regiment
1908–1912 – 1st Battalion, 1st Australian Infantry Regiment
1912–1913 – 21st Infantry (Sydney Battalion)
1913–1915 – 21st (Woollahra) Infantry
1915–1918 – 22nd Infantry
1918–1921 – 2nd Battalion, 19th Infantry Regiment
1921–1927 – 19th Battalion
1927–1930 – 19th Battalion (The South Sydney Regiment)
1930–1937 – 1st/19th Battalion
1937–1939 – 1st/19th Battalion (City of Sydney's Own Regiment)
1939–1941 – 20th/19th Battalion
1941–1945 – 19th Battalion (The South Sydney Regiment)
1966–1971 – 19th Battalion, Royal New South Wales Regiment.

== Notes ==
Footnotes

Citations
