= Open Bay, Papua New Guinea =

Coordinates: 4.80°S 151.54°E

Open Bay is a bay located to the south-west of Rabaul, on the northern coast New Britain around the neck of the Gazelle Peninsula, in West New Britain Province. The bay is surrounded by the villages of Baia and Maitanakunai. During the Australian administration of the area prior to Papua New Guinea's independence, the area was exploited as a timber producing region. The Mavelo Plantation was located nearby. During the final stages of World War II, Australian forces established a defensive line across the island between Open Bay and Wide Bay, Papua New Guinea during the Battle of Wide Bay–Open Bay in 1945.

== Climate ==
Open Bay has a tropical rainforest climate (Af) with heavy to very heavy rainfall year-round.

Climate data for Open Bay (Maitanakunai)
Month	Jan	Feb	Mar	Apr	May	Jun	Jul	Aug	Sep	Oct	Nov	Dec	Year
Mean daily maximum °C (°F)	31.0 (87.8)	30.8 (87.4)	30.8 (87.4)	30.5 (86.9)	30.6 (87.1)	30.8 (87.4)	29.3 (84.7)	29.7 (85.5)	30.7 (87.3)	30.7 (87.3)	31.1 (88.0)	30.9 (87.6)	30.6 (87.0)
Daily mean °C (°F)	27.1 (80.8)	27.0 (80.6)	27.0 (80.6)	26.7 (80.1)	27.0 (80.6)	26.8 (80.2)	25.9 (78.6)	26.2 (79.2)	26.8 (80.2)	27.0 (80.6)	27.2 (81.0)	27.1 (80.8)	26.8 (80.3)
Mean daily minimum °C (°F)	23.2 (73.8)	23.2 (73.8)	23.3 (73.9)	23.0 (73.4)	23.4 (74.1)	22.9 (73.2)	22.5 (72.5)	22.7 (72.9)	23.0 (73.4)	23.3 (73.9)	23.4 (74.1)	23.3 (73.9)	23.1 (73.6)
Average rainfall mm (inches)	447 (17.6)	435 (17.1)	508 (20.0)	354 (13.9)	199 (7.8)	221 (8.7)	246 (9.7)	251 (9.9)	217 (8.5)	189 (7.4)	219 (8.6)	431 (17.0)	3,717 (146.2)
Source: Climate-Data.org
