= Battle of Arawe =

1943–44 WWII battle in the Pacific Theater

- Part of World War II's Pacific War
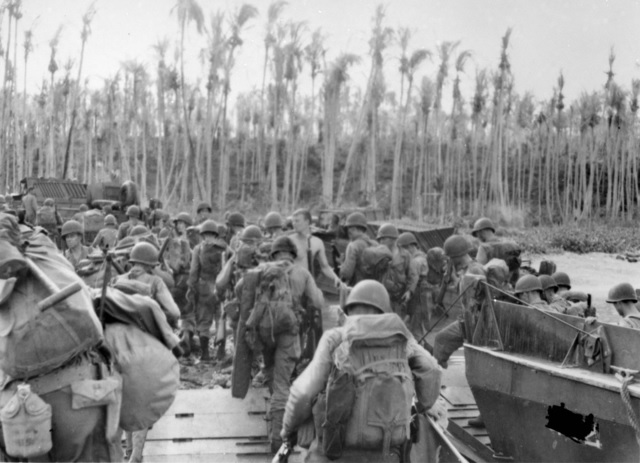
- U.S. Army soldiers landing at Arawe on 15 December 1943
Date	15 December 1943 – 24 February 1944
Location	Arawe, New Britain, Territory of New Guinea 6°9′16″S 149°2′13″E
Result	Allied victory

Belligerents
United States; Australia	Japan

Commanders and leaders
(United States) Julian W. Cunningham	(Empire of Japan) Masamitsu Komori

Strength
4,750	1,000

Casualties and losses
118 killed 352 wounded 4 missing	304 killed 3 captured

The Battle of Arawe (also known as Operation Director) was fought between Allied and Japanese forces during the New Britain campaign of World War II. The battle formed part of the Allied Operation Cartwheel and was a diversion before a larger landing at Cape Gloucester in late December 1943. The Japanese military was expecting an Allied offensive in western New Britain and was reinforcing the region at the time of the Allied landing in the Arawe area on 15 December 1943. The Allies secured Arawe after about a month of intermittent fighting with the outnumbered Japanese force.

Initial Allied goals for the landing at Arawe included securing a base for American PT boats and diverting Japanese forces away from Cape Gloucester. The PT boat base was subsequently deemed unnecessary and not built. Only a small Japanese force was stationed at Arawe at the time, although reinforcements were en route. The main Allied landing on 15 December was successful despite a failed subsidiary landing and problems coordinating the landing craft. American forces quickly secured a beachhead and dug in. Japanese air units made large-scale raids against the Arawe area in the days after the landing, and in late December Imperial Japanese Army (IJA) troops unsuccessfully counterattacked the American force. In mid-January 1944 the American force, reinforced with additional infantry and tanks, launched a brief offensive that pushed the Japanese back. The Japanese units at Arawe withdrew from the area towards the end of February as part of a general retreat from western New Britain.

There is no consensus among historians on whether the Allied offensive at Arawe was necessary. While some have argued that the landing served as a useful diversion ahead of the Cape Gloucester operation, others believe that the entire campaign in western New Britain was unnecessary and that the force employed at Arawe could have been better used elsewhere.

== Background ==
=== Military situation ===
Prior to World War II the island of New Britain was administered by Australia as part of the Territory of New Guinea. The Australian Naval and Military Expeditionary Force had captured the island from Germany in September 1914. Both Germany and Australia maintained colonial administrations and a plantation had been established at Arawe early in the period in which the island was ruled by Germany. New Britain was captured by Japan in early 1942.

In July 1942, the U.S. Joint Chiefs of Staff directed that the main objective of the Allied forces in the South Pacific and Southwest Pacific area commands was to capture the major Japanese base at Rabaul on the northeastern tip of New Britain. From August 1942, U.S. and Australian forces conducted a series of offensives in New Guinea and the Solomon Islands, with the goals of eliminating Japanese positions in the region and establishing air bases close to Rabaul. The Japanese forces in the area mounted a strong resistance but were unable to stop the Allied advance.

In June 1943 the Allies launched a major offensive—designated Operation Cartwheel—to capture Rabaul. During the next five months, Australian and U.S. forces under the overall command of General Douglas MacArthur advanced along the north coast of eastern New Guinea, capturing the town of Lae and the Huon Peninsula. U.S. forces under the command of Admiral William Halsey, Jr. simultaneously advanced through the Solomon Islands from Guadalcanal and established an air base at Bougainville in November 1943. In June 1943 the Joint Chiefs of Staff decided that it was unnecessary to capture Rabaul as the Japanese base there could be neutralized by blockade and aerial bombardment. MacArthur initially opposed this change in plans, but it was endorsed by the British and United States Combined Chiefs of Staff during the Quebec Conference in August 1943.

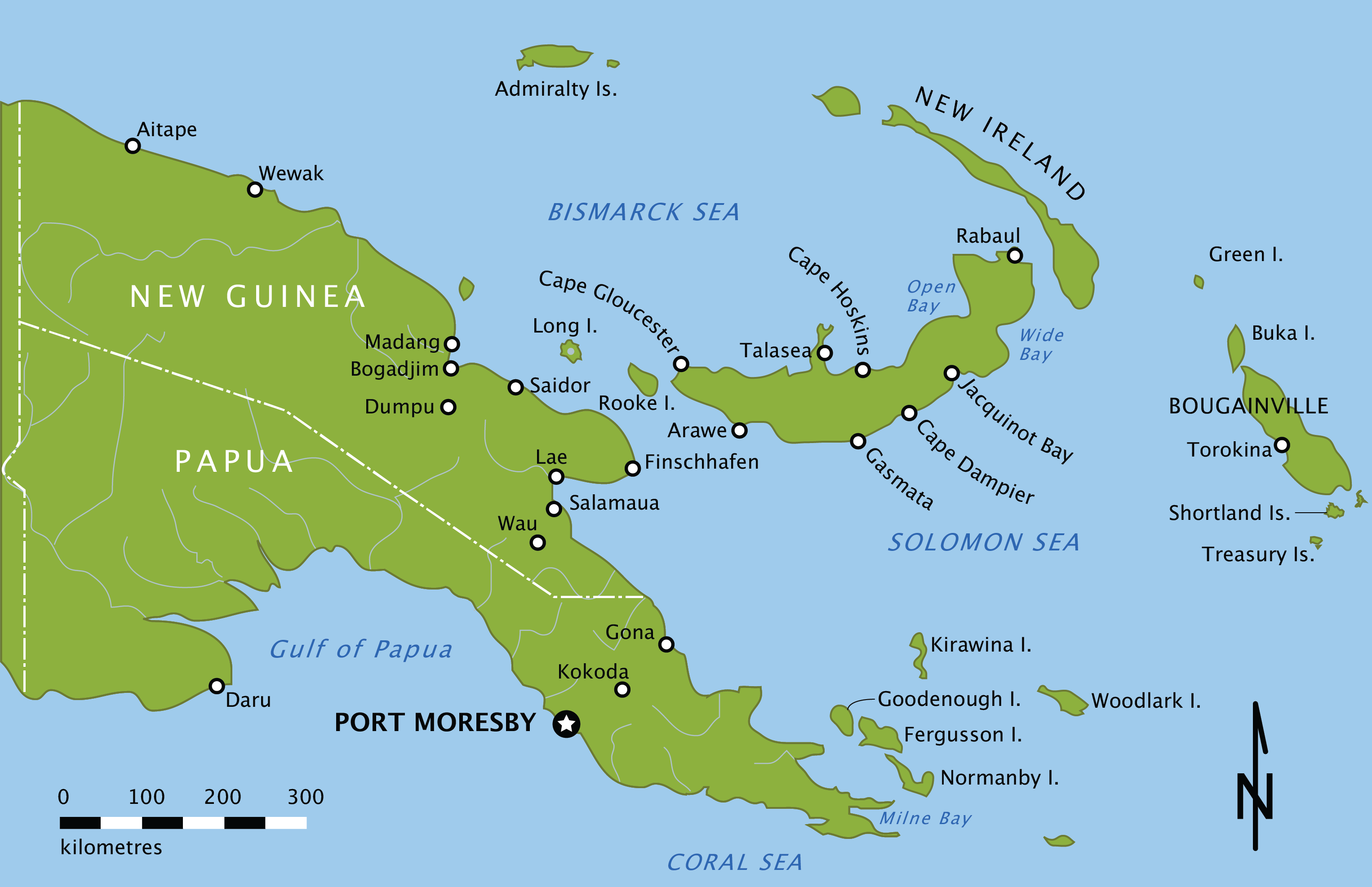
The area in which Operation Cartwheel took place

The Japanese Imperial General Headquarters assessed the strategic situation in the Southwest Pacific in late September 1943 and concluded that the Allies would attempt to break through the northern Solomon Islands and Bismarck Archipelago in the coming months en route to Japan's inner perimeter in the western and central Pacific. Accordingly, reinforcements were dispatched to strategic locations in the area in an attempt to slow the Allied advance. Strong forces were retained at Rabaul, however, as it was believed that the Allies would attempt to capture the town. At the time, Japanese positions in western New Britain were limited to airfields at Cape Gloucester on the island's western tip and several small way stations which provided small boats travelling between Rabaul and New Guinea with shelter from Allied aerial attacks.

On 22 September 1943 MacArthur's General Headquarters (GHQ) directed Lieutenant General Walter Krueger's Alamo Force to secure western New Britain and the surrounding islands. This operation had two goals, the first of which was to establish air and PT boat bases to attack the Japanese forces at Rabaul. The second objective was to secure the Vitiaz and Dampier Straits between New Guinea and New Britain so that convoys could safely pass through them en route to conduct further landings along New Guinea's north coast and beyond. To this end, GHQ directed that both Cape Gloucester and Gasmata on New Britain's south coast be captured. This offensive was code-named Operation Dexterity. The 1st Marine Division was selected for the Cape Gloucester operation, and the heavily reinforced 126th Regimental Combat Team from the 32nd Infantry Division was to attack Gasmata.

Senior Allied commanders disagreed over whether it was necessary to land forces in western New Britain. Lieutenant General George Kenney—commander of the Allied Air Forces in the Southwest Pacific—opposed the landings, arguing that his forces did not need air fields at Cape Gloucester as the existing bases in New Guinea and surrounding islands were adequate to support the planned landings in the region. Vice Admiral Arthur S. Carpender—commander of both the 7th Fleet and the Allied Naval Forces, Southwest Pacific Area—as well as Rear Admiral Daniel E. Barbey—commander of Task Force 76—supported occupying Cape Gloucester to secure both sides of the straits, but he opposed the landing at Gasmata as it was too close to the Japanese air bases at Rabaul. The Gasmata operation was cancelled in early November in response to the concerns raised by Kenney and the Navy as well as intelligence reports that the Japanese had reinforced their garrison there.

On 21 November, a conference between GHQ, Kenney, Carpender and Barbey was held in Brisbane at which it was decided to land a small force in the Arawe area. This operation had three goals: to divert Japanese attention from Cape Gloucester, to provide a base for PT boats, and to establish a defensive perimeter and make contact with the Marines once they landed. It was intended that PT boats operating from Arawe would disrupt Japanese barge traffic along the southern shore of New Britain and protect the Allied naval forces at Cape Gloucester from attack.

=== Geography ===
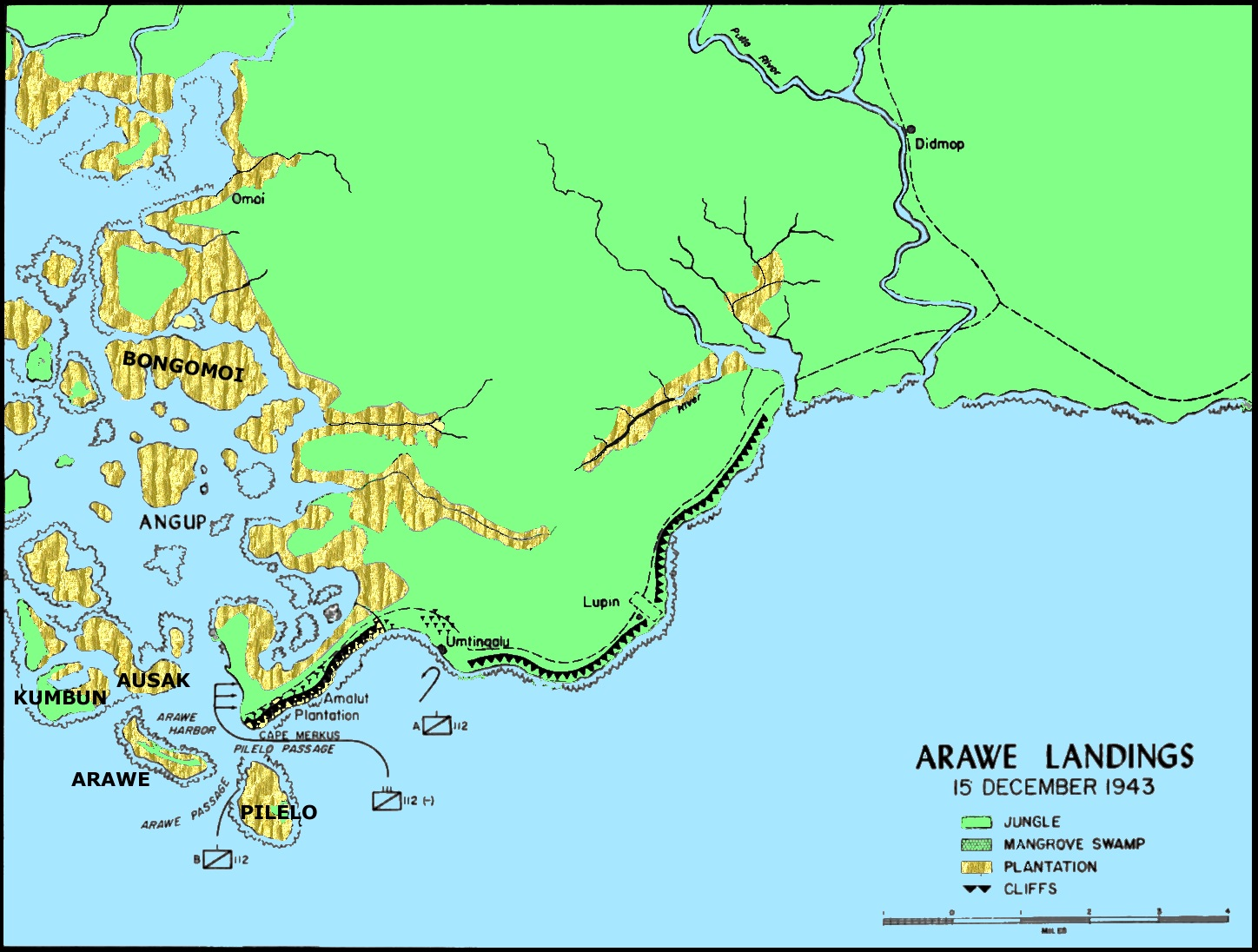
The Arawe area

The Arawe area lies on the south coast of New Britain about 100 mi (160 km) from the island's western tip. Its main geographical feature is Cape Merkus, which ends in the L-shaped Arawe Peninsula. Several small islands called the Arawe Islands lie to the southwest of the cape.

In late 1943, the Arawe Peninsula was covered by coconut trees which formed part of the Amalut Plantation; the terrain inland from the peninsula and on its offshore islands was swampy. Most of the shoreline in the area has limestone cliffs. There was a small unused airfield 4 mi (6.4 km) east of the neck of the Arawe Peninsula, and a coastal trail leading east from Cape Merkus to the Pulie River where it split into tracks running inland and along the coast. The terrain to the west of the peninsula was a trackless region of swamp and jungle, which was very difficult for troops to move through. Several of the beaches in the Arawe area were suitable for landing craft; the best were House Fireman, on the peninsula's west coast, and one near the village of Umtingalu to the east of the peninsula's base.

== Prelude ==
=== Planning ===
Alamo Force was responsible for coordinating plans for the invasion of western New Britain. The Arawe landing was scheduled for 15 December as this was the earliest date by which the air bases around Nadzab in New Guinea—which were needed to support the landing—could be made operational. This date also gave the landing force time to conduct essential training and rehearsals. As Arawe was believed to be only weakly defended, Krueger decided to use a smaller force than the one which had been intended for the landing at Gasmata. This force, designated the Director Task Force, was concentrated at Goodenough Island where it was stripped of all equipment not needed for combat operations. Logistical plans called for the assault echelon to carry 30 day's worth of general supplies and enough ammunition for three days of intensive combat. After the landing, holdings would be expanded to 60 day's worth of general supplies and six day's worth of all categories of ammunition other than anti-aircraft ammunition, for which a 10-day supply was thought necessary. The assault force and its supplies were to be carried in fast ships which could rapidly unload their cargo.

The commander of the PT boat force in the Southwest Pacific, Commander Morton C. Mumma, opposed building extensive PT boat facilities at Arawe as he had sufficient bases and Japanese barges normally sailed along the north coast of New Britain. Mumma took his concerns to Admiral Arthur S. Carpender and Vice Admiral Daniel E. Barbey, who eventually agreed that he would not be required to establish a base there if he thought it unnecessary. Instead, Mumma assigned six boats stationed at Dreger Harbor in New Guinea and Kiriwina Island to operate along the south coast of New Britain east of Arawe each night, and he asked only for emergency refuelling facilities at Arawe.

The Director Task Force's commander—Brigadier General Julian Cunningham—issued orders for the landing on 4 December. He directed that the Task Force would initially capture the Arawe Peninsula and its surrounding islands and establish an outpost on the trail leading to the Pulie River. The main body was to land at House Fireman Beach on the Arawe Peninsula at about dawn. Two troop-sized forces would conduct separate operations about an hour before the main landing. One troop was to capture Pitoe Island to the peninsula's south, as it was believed that the Japanese had established a radio station and a defensive position there which commanded the entrance to Arawe Harbor. The other troop was to land at Umtingalu and establish a blocking position on the coastal trail east of the peninsula. Once the beachhead was secure, amphibious patrols would be conducted to the west of the peninsula in an attempt to make contact with the 1st Marine Division at Cape Gloucester. U.S. Navy personnel on the planning staff were concerned about these subsidiary landings, as a night-time landing conducted at Lae in September had proven difficult.

=== Opposing forces ===
The Director Task Force was centered around the U.S. Army's 112th Cavalry Regimental Combat Team (112th RCT). This regiment had arrived in the Pacific in August 1942 but had not seen combat. It was dismounted and converted to an infantry unit in May 1943 and undertook an unopposed landing at Woodlark Island (designated Operation Chronicle) on 23 June. The 112th Cavalry Regiment was smaller and more lightly armed than U.S. infantry regiments as it had only two battalion-sized squadrons compared to the three battalions in infantry regiments. Moreover, the squadrons were smaller and more lightly equipped than their infantry equivalents. (Note: Each of the U.S. Army's dismounted cavalry regiments comprised a regimental headquarters and headquarters troop, a service troop, a weapons troop, a medical detachment, a band (whose members also served as stretcher bearers) and two cavalry squadrons. Each of the dismounted squadrons comprised a small headquarters and three rifle troops.) The 112th RCT's combat support units were the M2A1 howitzer-equipped 148th Field Artillery Battalion and the 59th Engineer Company. The other combat units of the Director Task Force were two batteries of the 470th Anti-aircraft Artillery Battalion (Automatic Weapons), most of the 236th Anti-aircraft Artillery Battalion (Searchlight), "A" Company of the United States Marine Corps 1st Amphibious Tractor Battalion and a detachment from the 26th Quartermaster War Dog Platoon. The 2nd Battalion of the 158th Infantry Regiment was held in reserve to reinforce the Director Task Force if required. Several engineer, medical, ordnance and other support units were scheduled to arrive at Arawe after the landing was completed. Cunningham requested a battery equipped with 90 mm (3.54 in) anti-aircraft guns, but none were available. The U.S. Navy's Beach Party Number 1 would also be landed with the Director Task Force and remain at Arawe until the beachhead was secured.

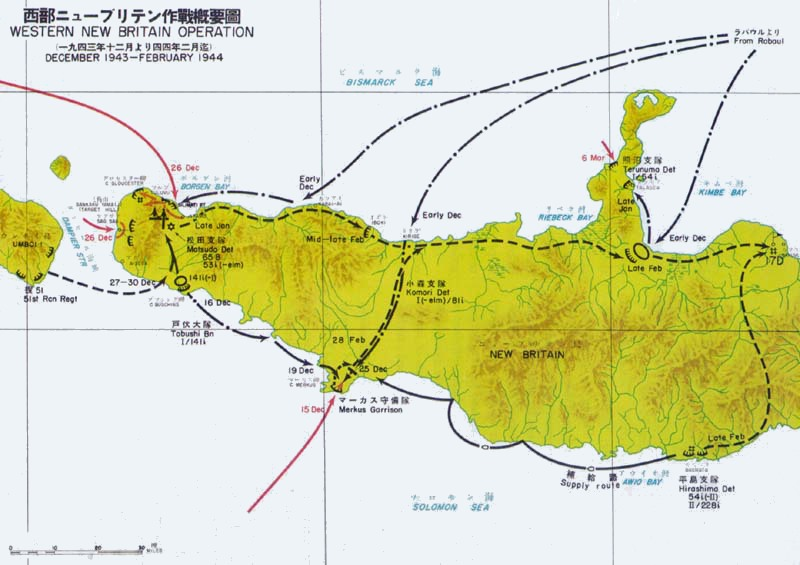
Movements of Japanese forces in western New Britain during late 1943 and early 1944 and locations of Allied landings

The Director Task Force was supported by Allied naval and air units. The naval force was drawn from TF 76 and comprised U.S. Navy destroyers USS Conyngham (Barbey's flagship), Shaw, Drayton, Bagley, Reid, Smith, Lamson, Flusser and Mahan and a transport group with destroyer transports USS Humphreys and Sands, the Australian landing ship infantry HMAS Westralia, landing ship dock USS Carter Hall, two patrol craft and two submarine chasers. The naval force also included a service group with three LSTs, three tugboats and the destroyer tender USS Rigel. United States Army Air Forces (USAAF) and Royal Australian Air Force (RAAF) units operating under the Fifth Air Force would support the landing, but only limited air support was to be available after 15 December as the available aircraft were needed for strategic missions against Japanese bases.

Australian coastwatchers stationed on New Britain were reinforced during September and October 1943 to provide warning of air attacks from Rabaul bound for the Allied landing sites and to report on Japanese barge and troop movements. In addition to a coastwatching team already in place at Cape Orford near Wide Bay, five other parties were sent to Cape Hoskins, Gasmata, Open Bay (on the north coast at the base of the Gazelle Peninsula), the area south of Wide Bay, and the neck between Wide Bay and Open Bay. The Gasmata party was discovered by the Japanese while en route to its destination and eliminated, but the other teams were in place by the end of October.

At the time of the Allied landing, the Arawe area was defended by only a small force, though reinforcements were en route. The Japanese force at Arawe comprised 120 soldiers and sailors organized in two temporary companies drawn from the 51st Division. The reinforcing units were elements of the 17th Division, which had been shipped from China to Rabaul during October 1943 to reinforce western New Britain ahead of the expected Allied invasion. The convoys carrying the division were attacked by U.S. Navy submarines and USAAF bombers and suffered 1,173 casualties. The 1st Battalion, 81st Infantry Regiment was assigned to defend Cape Merkus. However, it did not depart Rabaul until December as it needed to be reorganized after suffering casualties when the ship transporting it from China was sunk. In addition, two of its rifle companies, most of its heavy machine guns and all its 70 mm (2.76 in) howitzers were retained by the 8th Area Army at Rabaul, leaving the battalion with just its headquarters, two rifle companies and a machine gun platoon. This battalion—which came under the command of Major Masamitsu Komori—was a four-day march from Arawe when the Allies landed. (Note: Full-strength Japanese infantry battalions comprised a headquarters, a battalion train, a machine gun company, a battalion gun platoon or company and four infantry companies.) A company of soldiers from the 54th Infantry Regiment, some engineers and detachments from other units were also assigned to the Arawe area. The ground forces at Arawe came under the overall command of General Matsuda, whose headquarters were located near Cape Gloucester. The Japanese air units at Rabaul had been greatly weakened in the months prior to the landing at Arawe by prolonged Allied attacks and the transfer of the 7th Air Division to western New Guinea. Nevertheless, the Imperial Japanese Navy's (IJN) 11th Air Fleet had 100 fighters and 50 bombers based at Rabaul at the time of the landing at Arawe.

=== Preliminary operations ===
The Allies possessed little intelligence on western New Britain's terrain and the locations of Japanese forces, so they flew extensive air photography sorties over the region, and small ground patrols were landed from PT boats. A team from Special Service Unit No. 1 reconnoitered Arawe on the night of 9/10 December and concluded that there were few Japanese troops in the area. The Japanese detected this party near the village of Umtingalu and strengthened their defenses there.

Operation Dexterity was preceded by a major Allied air offensive which sought to neutralize the Japanese air units stationed at Rabaul. From 12 October until early November, the Fifth Air Force frequently attacked the airfields around the town as well as ships in its harbor. Aircraft flying from U.S. Navy aircraft carriers also attacked Rabaul on 5 and 11 November in support of the USMC's landing at Bougainville.

The Allied air forces began pre-invasion raids on western New Britain on 13 November. Few attacks were made on the Arawe area, however, as the Allies hoped to achieve tactical surprise for the landing and did not want to alert the Japanese to their intentions. Instead, heavy attacks were made against Gasmata, Ring Ring Plantation and Lindenhafen Plantation on New Britain's south coast. The Arawe area was struck for the first time on 6 December and again on 8 December; little opposition was encountered on either occasion. It was not until 14 December—the day before the landing—that heavy air attacks on Arawe were conducted; Allied aircraft flew 273 sorties against targets on New Britain's south coast that day. In addition to these air raids, a force comprising two Australian and two American destroyers (designated Task Force 74.2) bombarded the Gasmata area during the night of 29/30 November.

The Director Task Force was concentrated at Goodenough Island in early December 1943. The 112th Cavalry was notified that it had been selected for the Arawe operation on 24 November and departed Woodlark for the short voyage to Goodenough Island in two convoys that sailed on 30 and 31 November. All elements of the regiment were ashore at Goodenough by 2 December. A full-scale rehearsal of the landing was held at the island on 8 December; this revealed problems with coordinating the waves of boats and demonstrated that some of the force's officers were insufficiently trained in amphibious warfare. There was insufficient time for further training to rectify these problems, however. At Goodenough, the troopers of the 112th Cavalry were issued with several types of infantry weapons with which they had not previously been equipped. Each of the regiment's rifle squads received a Browning Automatic rifle and a Thompson submachine gun; 2.36-inch (6.0 cm) bazookas, rifle grenades and flame throwers were also issued. The cavalrymen received little training on the use of these weapons and did not know how to make the best use of them in combat.

The invasion force boarded transport ships during the afternoon of 13 December, and the convoy sailed at midnight. It proceeded to Buna to rendezvous with most of the escorting destroyers and made a feint north toward Finschhafen before turning toward Arawe after dusk on 14 December. The convoy was detected by a Japanese aircraft shortly before it anchored off Arawe at 03:30 on 15 December, and the 11th Air Fleet at Rabaul began to prepare aircraft to attack it.

== Battle ==
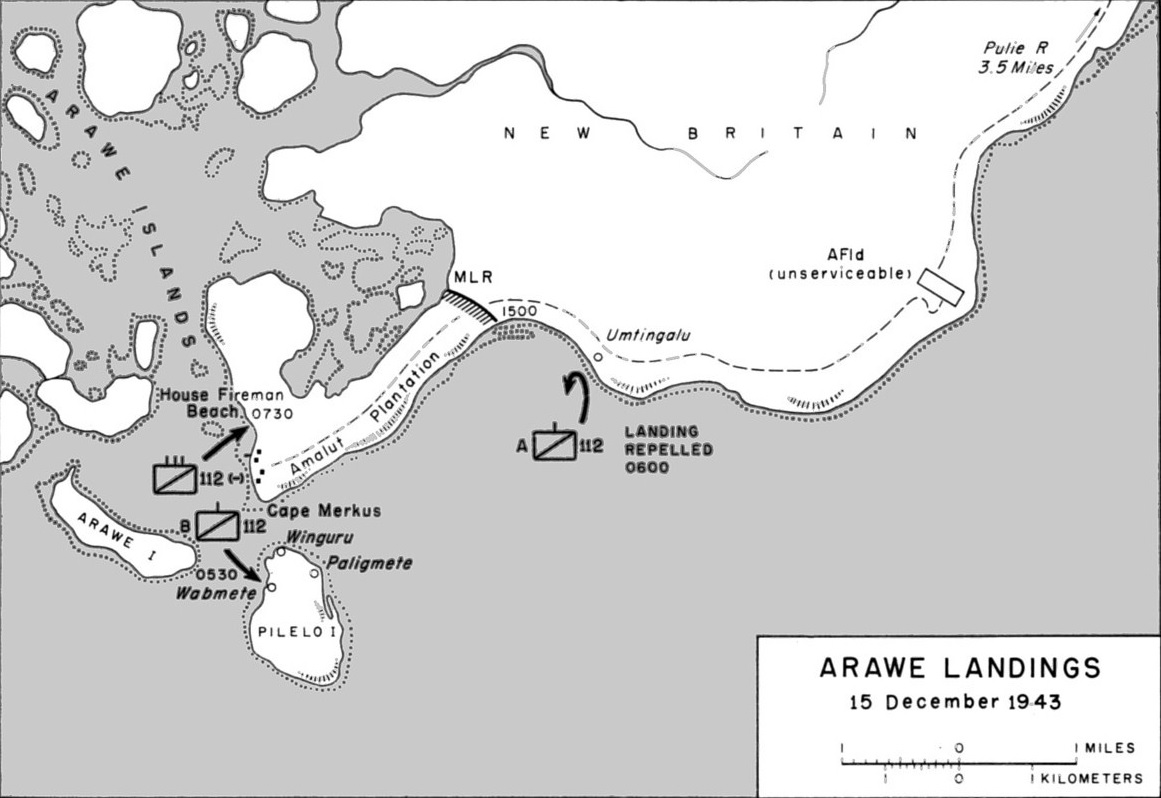
Arawe landings, 15 December 1943

=== Landings ===
Shortly after the assault convoy arrived off Arawe, Carter Hall launched LVT amphibious tractors and Westralia lowered landing craft, both operated by specialized Marine and U.S. Army units. The two large transports departed for New Guinea at 05:00. The high speed transports carrying "A" and "B" Troops of the 112th Cavalry Regiment's 1st Squadron closed to within 1,000 yd (910 m) of Umtingalu and Pilelo Island respectively, and unloaded the soldiers into rubber boats.

"A" Troop's attempt to land at Umtingalu ended in failure. At about 05:25 the troop came under fire from machine guns, rifles and a 25 mm (0.98 in) cannon as it was nearing the shore, and all but three of its 15 rubber boats were sunk. Shaw—the destroyer assigned to support the landing—was unable to fire upon the Japanese positions until 05:42 as her crew initially could not determine if the soldiers in the water were in the ship's line of fire. Once she had a clear shot, Shaw silenced the Japanese force with two salvos from her 5 in (130 mm) guns. The surviving cavalrymen were rescued by small boats and later landed at House Fireman beach; casualties in this operation were 12 killed, four missing and 17 wounded. (Note: The writer Norman Mailer, who served in the 112th Cavalry Regiment during the Battle of Luzon in 1945, based an incident in his novel The Naked and the Dead on this failed landing.)

The landing conducted by "B" Troop at Pilelo Island was successful. The goal of this operation was to destroy a Japanese radio station believed to be at the village of Paligmete on the island's east coast. The troop was originally intended to come ashore near Paligmete, but the landing site was switched to the island's west coast after "A" Troop came under attack. After disembarking from their boats, the cavalrymen advanced east and came under fire from a small Japanese force stationed in two caves near the village of Winguru on the island's north coast. Ten cavalrymen were detached to contain the Japanese while the remainder of the troop continued to Paligmete. The village proved to be unoccupied and did not contain the suspected radio station. The majority of "B" Troop then attacked Winguru using bazookas and flamethrowers to destroy the Japanese positions. One American and seven Japanese soldiers were killed in the fighting. Personnel from the RAAF's No. 335 Radar Station also landed on Pilelo Island on 15 December and established a radar station there within 48 hours.

The 2nd Squadron, 112th Cavalry Regiment made the main landing at House Fireman Beach. The landing was delayed by a strong current and difficulties forming the LVTs into an assault formation, and the first wave went ashore at 07:28 rather than 06:30 as planned. Destroyers bombarded the beach with 1,800 rounds of 5 inch ammunition between 06:10 and 06:25, and B-25 Mitchells strafed the area once the bombardment concluded, but the landing area was not under fire as the troops approached the beach. This allowed Japanese machine gunners to fire on the LVTs, but these guns were rapidly silenced by rockets fired from SC-742 and two DUKWs. The first wave of cavalrymen were fortunate to meet little opposition as there were further delays in landing the follow-up waves owing to differences in the speeds of the two types of LVTs used. While the four follow-up waves were scheduled to land at five-minute intervals after the first wave, the second landed 25 minutes after the initial force, and the succeeding three waves landed simultaneously 15 minutes later. Within two hours of the landing, all the large Allied ships other than Barbey's flagship had departed from Arawe. Conyngham remained in the area to rescue the survivors of the landing at Umtingalu and withdrew later that day.

Once ashore, the cavalrymen rapidly secured the Arawe Peninsula. An American patrol sent to the peninsula's toe met only scattered resistance from Japanese rear guards. More than 20 Japanese located in a cave on the east side of the peninsula were killed by members of "E" Troop and personnel from the squadron headquarters; the remaining Japanese units in the area retreated to the east. The 2nd Squadron reached the peninsula's base at 14:30, where it began to prepare its main line of resistance (MLR). By the end of 15 December, more than 1,600 Allied troops were ashore. The two Japanese Army companies that had been stationed at Arawe withdrew to the northeast and took up positions at Didmop on the Pulie River about 8 mi (13 km) from the MLR; the naval unit defending Umtingalu retreated inland in a state of disarray.

The Allied naval force off Arawe was subjected to a heavy air raid shortly after the landing. At 09:00 eight Aichi D3A "Val" dive bombers escorted by 56 A6M5 "Zero" fighters evaded the USAAF combat air patrol of 16 P-38 Lightnings. The Japanese force attacked the recently arrived first supply echelon, which comprised five Landing Craft Tank and 14 Landing Craft Medium, but these ships managed to evade the bombs dropped on them. The first wave of attackers suffered no losses, but at 11:15 four P-38s shot down a Zero, and at 18:00 a force of 30 Zeros and 12 Mitsubishi G4M3 "Betty" and Mitsubishi Ki-21-II "Sally" bombers was driven off by four P-38s. The Japanese lost two Zeros in the day's air actions, but both pilots survived.

=== Air attacks and base development ===
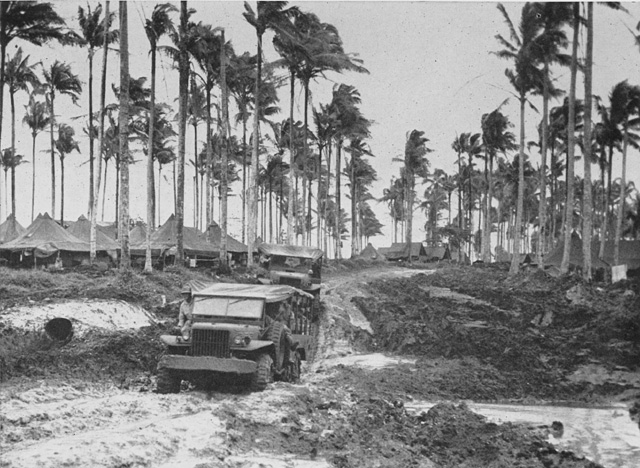
Two U.S. Army trucks moving through a camp area at Arawe

Although the U.S. ground troops faced no opposition in the days immediately after the landing, naval convoys carrying reinforcements to the Arawe area were repeatedly attacked. The second supply echelon came under continuous air attack on 16 December, resulting in the loss of APc-21 as well as damage to SC-743, YMS-50 and four LCTs. About 42 men on board these ships were killed or seriously wounded. Another reinforcement convoy was attacked three times by dive bombers on 21 December as it unloaded at Arawe. Overall, at least 150 Japanese aircraft attacked Arawe that day. Further air attacks took place on 26, 27 and 31 December. However, the Allied air forces were able to mount a successful defense of the Arawe area as the coastwatcher parties in New Britain provided 30 to 60 minutes warning of most incoming raids. Between 15 and 31 December, at least 24 Japanese bombers and 32 fighters were shot down near Arawe. (Note: According to Hata, Imperial Japanese Navy air units based at Rabaul lost three Zeros on the 16th, four Zeros on the 21st, five Zeros on the 26th, four Zeros on the 27th, and four Zeros on the 31st in raids on both Arawe and Cape Gloucester.) During the same time period, Allied air units also raided airfields at Rabaul and Madang in New Guinea which were believed to be the bases of the aircraft which had attacked Arawe. In aerial combat over Rabaul on 17, 19, and 23 December, 14 Zeros were shot down by Allied aircraft. The process of unloading ships at Arawe was hampered by air attacks and congestion on House Fireman Beach. The beach party contributed to these delays as it was inexperienced and too small. The resultant problems with unloading LCTs caused some to leave the area before discharging all their cargo.

Air attacks on Arawe dropped off after 1 January 1944. As a result of the heavy losses they suffered during attacks on Arawe and Cape Gloucester, and the damage caused by Allied raids on Rabaul, Japanese air units conducted only small-scale raids at night after this date. The IJN fighter units based at Rabaul and nearby Kavieng were also kept busy throughout January and February defending their bases from continuous Allied air attacks. Few raids were made against the Arawe area after 90 mm anti-aircraft guns were established there on 1 February. These weak attacks did not disrupt the Allied convoys. In the three weeks after the landing, 6,287 short tons (5,703 t) of supplies as well as 541 artillery guns and vehicles were transported to Arawe. On 20 February, the Japanese air units at Rabaul and Kavieng were permanently withdrawn to Truk, ending any significant aerial threat to Allied forces in New Britain from the IJN.

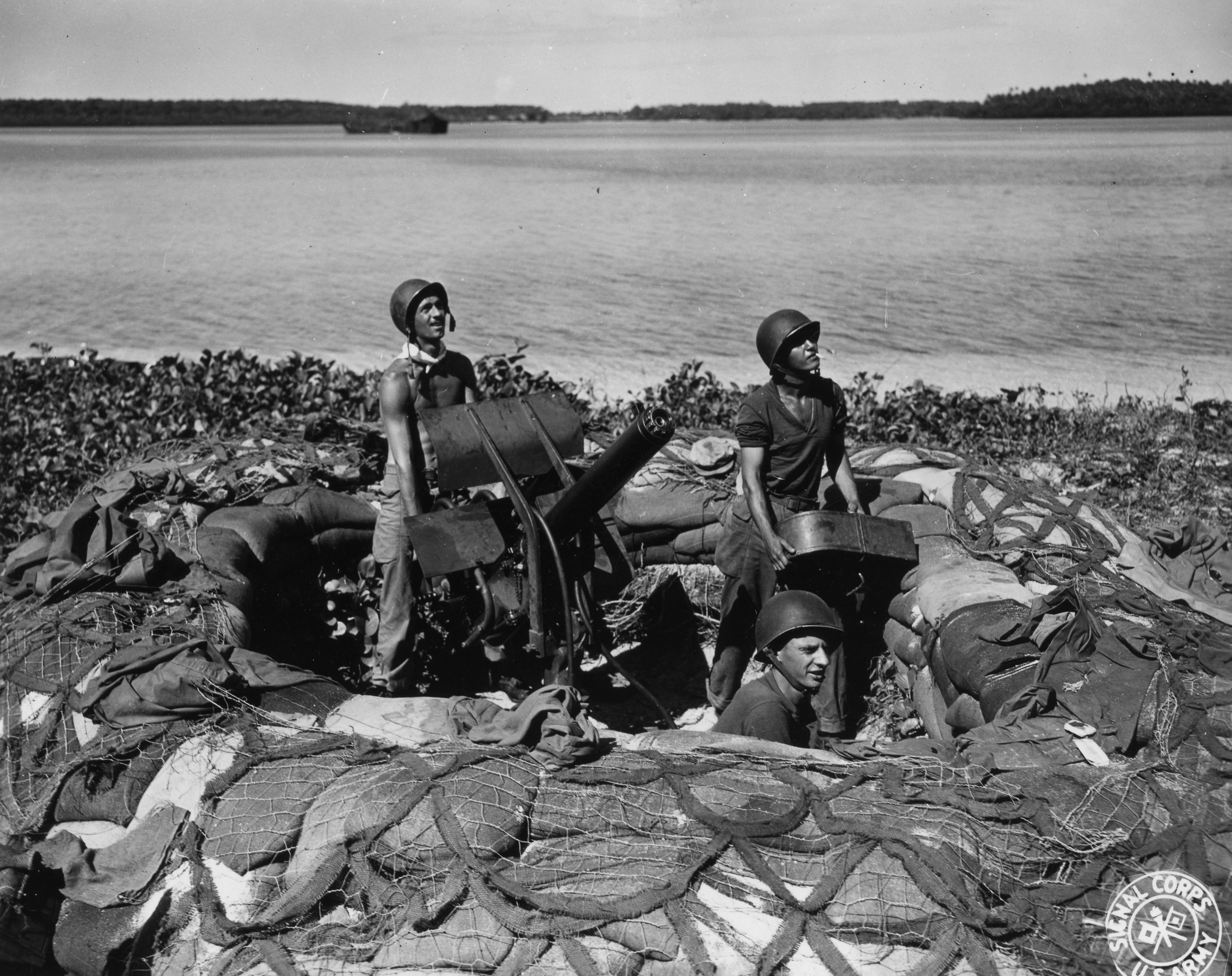
A U.S. Army anti-aircraft gun position at Arawe in January 1944

Following the landing, the 59th Engineer Company constructed logistics facilities in the Arawe area. Because of the Japanese air raids, priority was given to the construction of a partially underground evacuation hospital, which was completed in January 1944. The underground hospital was replaced with a 120-bed above-ground facility in April 1944. Pilelo Island was selected for the site of the PT boat facilities, and a pier for refueling the boats and dispersed fuel storage bays were built there. A 172 ft (52 m) pier was constructed at House Fireman Beach between 26 February and 22 April 1944 to accommodate small ships; three LCT jetties were also built north of the beach. A 920 ft (280 m) by 100 ft (30 m) airstrip was hurriedly built for artillery observation aircraft on 13 January, and this was later upgraded and surfaced with coral. The engineer company also constructed 5 mi (8.0 km) of all-weather roads in the Arawe region and provided the Director Task Force with water via salt water distillation units on Pilelo Island and wells dug on the mainland. These projects were continuously hampered by shortages of construction materials, but the engineers were able to complete them by improvising and making use of salvaged material.

The 112th Cavalry RCT strengthened its defensive positions during the week following the invasion. As "A" Troop had lost all of its weapons and other equipment during the landing attempt at Umtingalu, supplies were air-dropped into the beachhead during the afternoon of 16 December to re-equip the unit. The troop was also assigned 50 replacement personnel. Most of "B" Troop was also transferred from Pilelo Island to the mainland in the days after the landing. The regiment improved its MLR by removing vegetation in order to create clear fields of fire, establishing minefields and wire entanglements and laying down a field telephone network. A reserve defensive line was also established closer to Cape Merkus, and patrols were conducted each day along the shores of the peninsula in search of Japanese personnel attempting to infiltrate the Task Force's rear area. These patrols located and killed between ten and twenty Japanese near Cape Merkus. In addition, the regiment established a network of observation posts throughout the Arawe area; these included positions in villages, key positions on the peninsula and on several offshore islands. "G" Troop was assigned to secure Umtingalu, and after doing so the troop established a patrol base at the village as well as two observation posts along the track which connected it to the MLR.

=== Japanese response ===
The commander of the Japanese 17th Division—Lieutenant General Yasushi Sakai—ordered that Arawe be urgently reinforced when he was informed of the landing there. He did not believe that this would be the main Allied effort in western New Britain, however. The force under Komori was ordered to make haste. The 1st Battalion, 141st Infantry Regiment, stationed at Cape Bushing on the south coast of New Britain about 40 mi (64 km) east of Arawe, was also directed to move by sea to counter the Allied invasion. One of this battalion's infantry companies remained at Cape Bushing. Komori was appointed the commander of all Japanese forces in the Arawe area, which were subsequently designated the Komori Force. The 1st Battalion, 141st Infantry Regiment landed at the village of Omoi on the night of 18 December and started overland the next day to link up with Komori at Didmop. The battalion took eight days to cover the 7 mi (11 km) between Omoi and Didmop as it became lost on several occasions while travelling through trackless jungle and paused whenever contact with American forces seemed likely. Komori reached Didmop on 19 December and gathered the units that had retreated from Umtingalu into his command. On the basis of discussions with personnel who had witnessed the landing at Arawe, Komori mistakenly concluded that they had greatly overestimated the size of the Allied force. As a result, on 20 December he decided to launch a counteroffensive against the American positions.

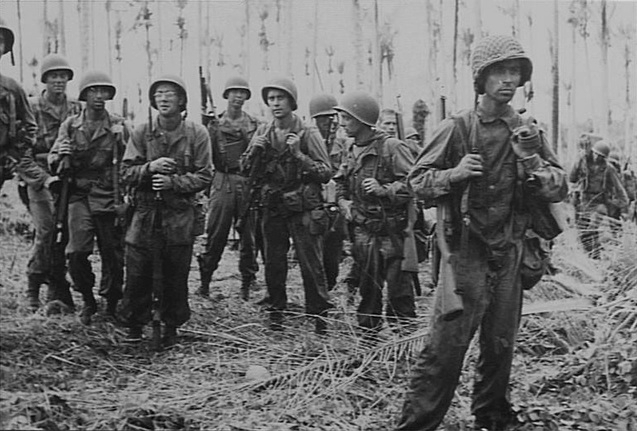
American soldiers returning to positions at Arawe after completing a patrol in December 1943

After establishing its beachhead, the Director Task Force conducted a series of reconnaissance patrols. Cunningham had been ordered to gather intelligence on Japanese forces in western New Britain, and on 17 December he dispatched a patrol of cavalrymen in two LCVPs (Landing Craft, Vehicle, Personnel) to the west of Arawe to investigate the Itni River area. These landing craft encountered seven Japanese barges carrying part of the 1st Battalion, 141st Infantry Regiment near Cape Peiho, 20 mi (32 km) west of Arawe, on 18 December. After an exchange of gunfire the U.S. soldiers abandoned their landing craft and returned to Arawe along the coast. Another patrol travelling in LCVPs was fired on by Japanese barges near Umtingalu on 18 December but was able to return to Cape Merkus. Japanese barges were also sighted near Arawe on 23 December. Cunningham believed that a large Japanese force was heading for the beachhead and contacted Krueger on 24 December to request that the 2nd Battalion of the 158th Infantry Regiment be dispatched to reinforce his command. Krueger agreed to this request and ordered that three of the battalion's four infantry companies be sent to Arawe. "G" Company of the 2nd Battalion, 158th Infantry arrived on 27 December and the other two companies reached Arawe in early January.

After organizing his force while waiting for the 1st Battalion, 141st Infantry Regiment, Komori began his advance on Arawe on 24 December. He arrived at the airstrip to the north of Arawe during the early hours of Christmas Day. During that morning, elements of the Komori Force ambushed two platoon-sized American patrols traveling in trucks northeast of Umtingalu. The American units withdrew to the village and reinforced "G" Troop's defensive position there. The American force defeated several Japanese attempts to move around Umtingalu during the day and killed at least three enemy soldiers. Cunningham believed that the force encountered around Umtingalu was the advance guard of a much larger body of Japanese soldiers advancing from Gasmata and so withdrew the troops stationed around the village to positions behind the MLR. At 22:30 that night, 50 Japanese soldiers made a poorly coordinated attack on the MLR. While they succeeded in overrunning some American positions, the Japanese were repulsed by fire from the 112th Cavalry's 60-millimeter (2.4 in) mortars. The Americans lost one man killed and eight wounded, and the Japanese suffered twelve casualties.

The Japanese offensive continued after the Christmas Day attack. Two small attacks, each involving 15 soldiers, were made against the eastern edge of the MLR on the nights of 26 and 27 December. These were also repulsed by the 112th Cavalry's light mortars and inflicted only a small number of casualties on the American force. On 28 December part of the 112th Cavalry Regiment's "B" Troop set out from the MLR in an attempt to reach Umtingalu but withdrew after encountering snipers and some light mortar fire. A platoon from "C" Troop also made an unsuccessful patrol from the western end of the MLR during which it suffered six casualties from Japanese machine gun and rifle fire. The same day Komori dispatched a force of between 20 and 30 soldiers to destroy the American mortar positions. The Japanese soldiers infiltrated the American positions by wading through swamps at the western end of the MLR but were detected before they could reach dry land. The Director Task Force mounted a strong response which included a counterattack by elements of three cavalry troops and a platoon from the 158th Infantry Regiment supported by mortars. The Japanese force suffered 17 casualties.

The 1st Battalion, 141st Infantry Regiment arrived in the Arawe area on the afternoon of 29 December and conducted several small and unsuccessful attacks in early January before taking up positions about 400–500 yd (370–460 m) north of the American MLR. These positions comprised shallow trenches and foxholes which were difficult to see. Although there were only about 100 Japanese soldiers in the area, they moved their six machine guns frequently, making them difficult targets for American mortars and artillery.

=== American counter-attack ===
An American patrol located the Japanese defensive position on 1 January 1944. "B" Troop of the 112th Cavalry Regiment launched an attack later that morning but was beaten off by heavy fire; the Americans suffered three killed and 15 wounded in this action. On 4 January "G" Troop incurred three killed and 21 wounded in an unsuccessful attack on well-built Japanese positions. This operation had been conducted without artillery support in an attempt to surprise the Japanese and also included a feint against Umtingalu involving several LCMs. Further attacks on 6, 7 and 11 January failed to make any headway but gave the cavalrymen experience in maneuvering through the Japanese defensive positions. These American operations were conducted on a limited scale as Cunningham and the 112th Cavalry Regiment's other senior officers believed that the unit had already achieved the goals of the landing at Arawe and did not want to incur unnecessary casualties.

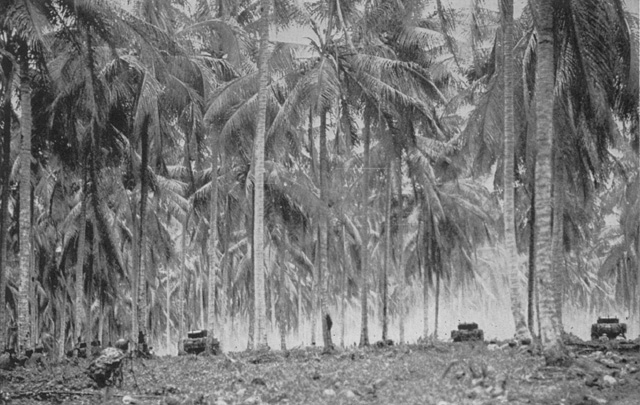
USMC tanks supporting the Army advance on 16 January

On 6 January Cunningham requested further reinforcements, including tanks, to tackle the Japanese defenses. Krueger approved this request and ordered "F" Company, 158th Infantry Regiment and "B" Company of the USMC 1st Tank Battalion to Arawe; the two units arrived on 10 and 12 January respectively. The Marine tanks and two companies of the 158th Infantry Regiment subsequently practiced tank-infantry cooperation from 13 to 15 January; during this period the 112th Cavalry continued to conduct patrols into Japanese-held areas. By this time, the Komori Force had incurred casualties of at least 65 killed, 75 wounded and 14 missing in action as a result of its offensive actions as well as the attacks on it conducted by the Director Task Force. The Japanese were also suffering from severe supply shortages and an outbreak of dysentery.

The Director Task Force launched its attack on 16 January. That morning, a squadron of B-24 Liberator heavy bombers dropped 136 bombs on the Japanese defenses, and 20 B-25s strafed the area. Following an intensive artillery and mortar barrage the Marine tank company, two companies of the 158th Infantry and C Troop, 112th Cavalry Regiment attacked. The tanks led the advance, with each being followed by a group of infantrymen. The cavalry troop and three tanks were initially held in reserve but were sent into action at 12:00 to mop up a Japanese position. The attack was successful and reached its objectives by 16:00. Cunningham then directed the force to withdraw to the MLR; during this part of the operation two Marine tanks—which had become immobile—were destroyed to prevent the Japanese from using them as pillboxes. American engineers destroyed the Japanese defensive position the next day. The Director Task Force suffered 22 killed and 64 wounded in this operation and estimated that 139 Japanese had been killed.

Following the American attack, Komori pulled his remaining force back to defend the airstrip. As this was not an Allied objective, the Japanese were not subjected to further attacks by ground troops other than occasional patrol clashes and ambushes. As a result of the supply shortages, many of the Japanese soldiers fell sick. Attempts to bring supplies in by sea from Gasmata were disrupted by U.S. Navy PT boats, and the force lacked enough porters to supply itself through overland trails. Komori concluded that his force was serving no purpose and on 8 February informed his superiors that it faced destruction because of supply shortages. They responded by ordering Komori to hold his positions, though his force was awarded two Imperial citations in recognition of its supposed success in defending the airstrip.

== Aftermath ==
The 1st Marine Division's landing at Cape Gloucester on 26 December 1943 was successful. The Marines secured the airfields that were the main objective of the operation on 29 December against only light Japanese opposition. Heavy fighting took place during the first two weeks of 1944 when the Marines advanced south to the east of their initial beachhead to secure Borgen Bay. Little fighting took place once this area had been captured, and the Marines patrolled extensively in an attempt to locate the Japanese. On 16 February a Marine patrol from Cape Gloucester made contact with an Army patrol from Arawe at the village of Gilnit. On 23 February the remnants of the Japanese force at Cape Gloucester were ordered to withdraw to Rabaul.

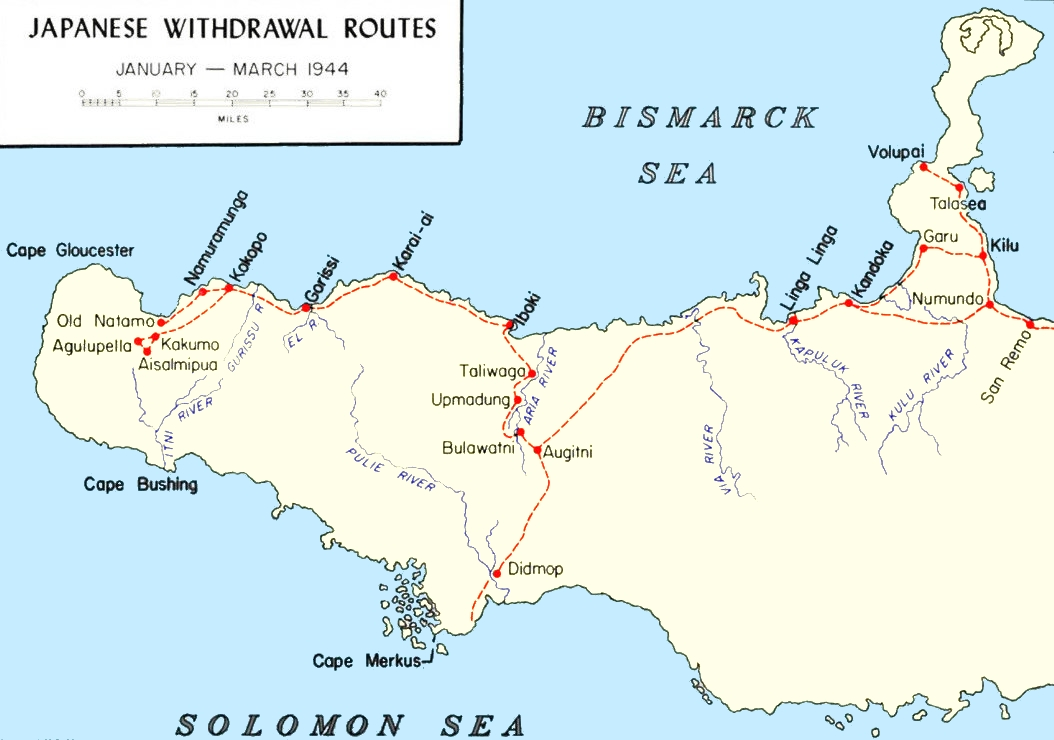
Japanese evacuation routes from western New Britain

The Komori Force was also directed to withdraw on 24 February as part of the general Japanese retreat from western New Britain. The Japanese immediately began to leave their positions and head north along inland trails to join other units. The Americans did not detect this withdrawal until 27 February, when an attack conducted by the 2nd Squadron, 112th Cavalry and the Marine tank company to clear the Arawe area of Japanese encountered no opposition. The Director Task Force subsequently established observation posts along the southern coast of New Britain and increased the distances covered by its reconnaissance patrols.

Komori fell behind his unit and was killed on 9 April near San Remo on New Britain's north coast when he, his executive officer, and two enlisted men they were travelling with were ambushed by a patrol from the 2nd Battalion, 5th Marines, which had landed around Volupai and captured Talasea on the Willaumez Peninsula in early March.

The Japanese force at Arawe suffered much heavier casualties than the Allies. The Director Task Force's total casualties between 15 December 1943 and the end of major fighting in the area were 118 dead, 352 wounded, and four missing. Most of these casualties were members of the 112th Cavalry Regiment, which suffered 72 killed, 142 wounded and four missing. Japanese casualties over this period were 304 men killed and three captured.

In the period immediately after the Japanese withdrawal, the Director Task Force remained at Arawe. In line with standard practice, the 112th Cavalry continued to improve the defensive positions in the area. The regiment also undertook training, and some men were granted leave to Australia and the United States. Combat patrols continued to be conducted in the Arawe region in search of Japanese stragglers. Elements of the 40th Infantry Division began to arrive at Arawe in April 1944 to assume responsibility for garrisoning the area. The 112th Cavalry Regiment was informed that it was to be deployed in New Guinea in early June, and the Director Task Force was dissolved at this time. The regiment sailed for the Aitape area of New Guinea on 8 June and next saw combat there during the Battle of Driniumor River. The 40th Infantry Division maintained a garrison at Arawe until the Australian Army's 5th Division assumed responsibility for New Britain in late November 1944.

Historians disagree over whether the Arawe operation was worthwhile for the Allies. The official history of the USMC in World War II stated that the presence of two experienced Japanese battalions at Arawe made the 1st Marine Division's task at Cape Gloucester easier. However, Samuel Eliot Morison writes that "Arawe was of small value" as the Allies never used it as a naval base and the garrison stationed in the area after the landings would have been better employed elsewhere. The U.S. Army's official history concluded that in retrospect the landings at Arawe and Cape Gloucester "were probably not essential to the reduction of Rabaul or the approach to the Philippines", though the offensive in western New Britain had some benefits and was not "excessively high in casualties".
