= Shannon Fisher =

American writer and commentator

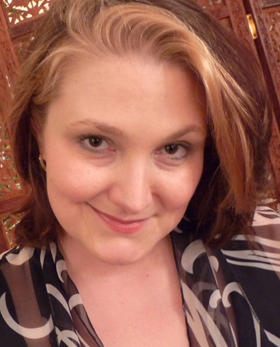

Chief of Staff to the Second Lady of the United States
- Incumbent
- Assumed office January 20, 2025
- Vice President: JD Vance
- Second Lady: Usha Vance
- Preceded by: Julie Mason

Senior advisor to the Second lady
- Incumbent
- Assumed office January 20, 2025
- Second Lady: Usha Vance
- Chief of Staff: Herself

Director of Operations to the Chair of the Republican National Committee
- In office 2017–2023

Personal details
- Education: University of Virginia; College of William & Mary

Shannon Fisher is an American writer, social and political commentator, and the host of two talk radio shows on the Authors on the Air Global Radio Network, The Authentic Woman and Our Lives with Shannon Fisher. She is also a frequent host of the National Press Club's Update-1 Podcast. and a notable women's rights activist.

== Radio host ==
Fisher began her career in radio in September 2013 as a panelist on the Authors on the Air Global Radio Network's show, A Global Conversation on Domestic Violence. She went on to host A Global Conversation on Human and Sex Trafficking in February 2014 and was subsequently asked by the network's owner to do a weekly show on women's social and political issues, in addition to highlighting women with careers in the arts. In February 2017, Fisher began hosting an additional show on the network, Our Lives with Shannon Fisher, which covers a broader range of global societal issues.

Fisher is also among a small team of hosts of the National Press Club's Update-1 Podcast, which addresses current events from the perspective of the news media.

== Activism ==
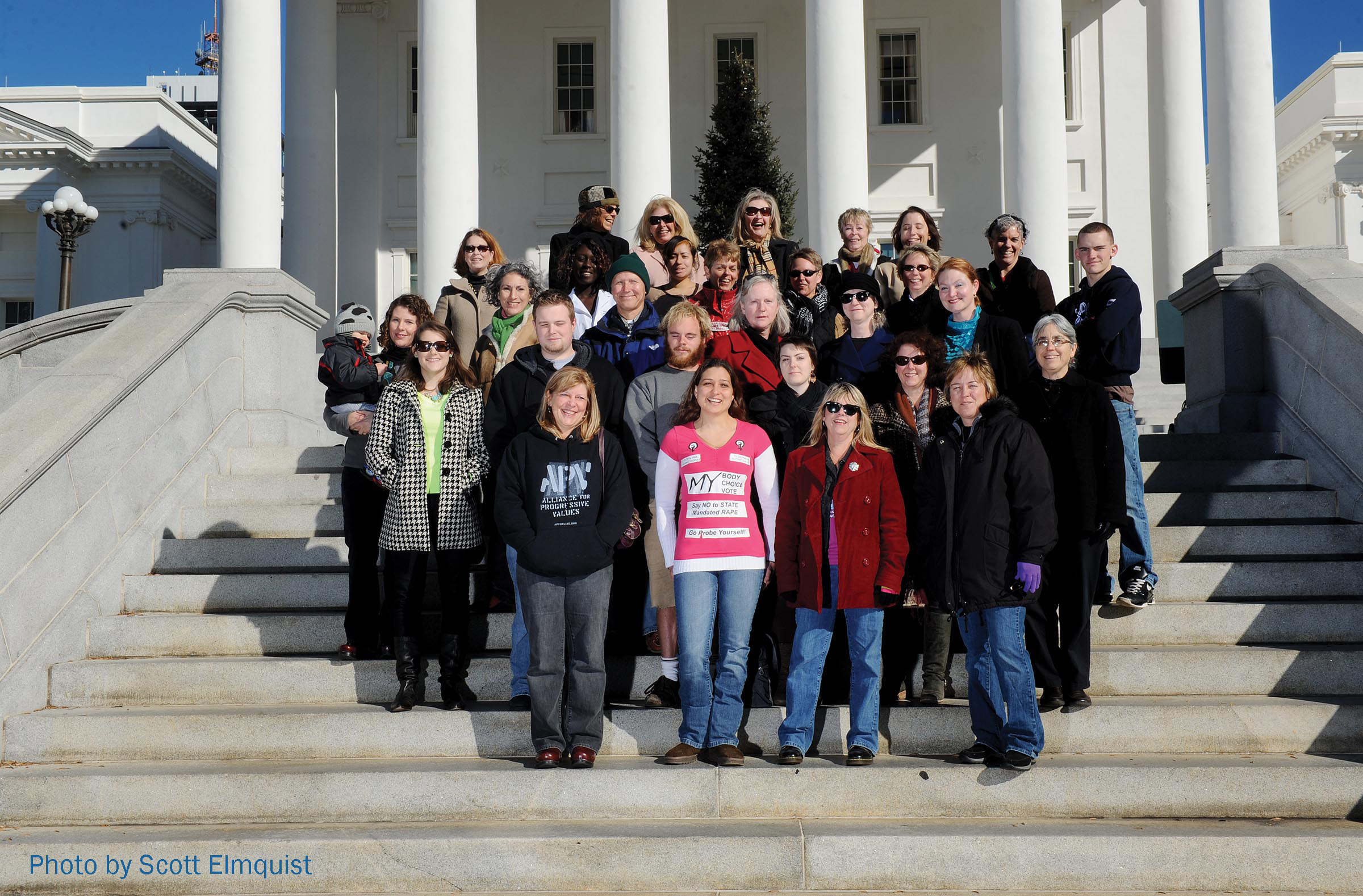
Shannon Fisher standing on the Virginia Capitol steps with the other women's rights activists who were selected by Style Weekly as the 2012 Richmonders of the Year. Photo by Scott Elmquist.

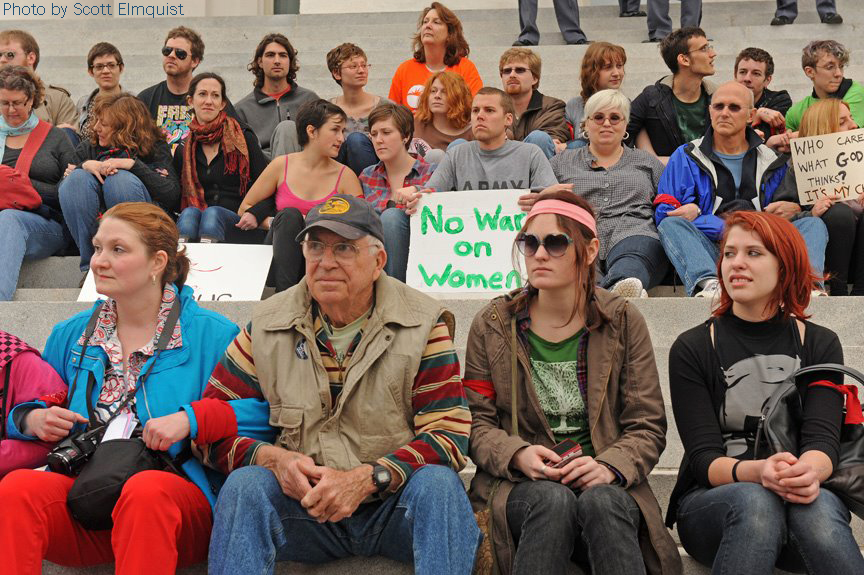
Shannon Fisher, and other protesters, sitting on the steps of the Virginia Capitol during the March 3, 2012 protest that made national headlines. Photo by Scott Elmquist.

Fisher participated in a demonstration on March 3, 2012, against transvaginal ultrasound legislation in the Virginia General Assembly, during which approximately 1000 protesters marched through the streets of downtown Richmond, Virginia to the steps of the Virginia Capitol building. Thirty protesters were arrested. Photographs of the event were shared worldwide, encouraging protests against similar legislation introduced in other state legislatures. The Virginia protest was featured in the film Political Bodies, which won "Best Documentary" at the Austin Film Festival in 2013.

In January 2013, Fisher was included among women's rights activists named the "2012 Richmonders of the Year" for their participation in the March 2012 protest by the staff of Richmond's Style Weekly alternative newspaper.

Fisher co-founded UniteWomen.org's "Unite Against Rape" campaign, along with fellow executive committee members Renee Davis, Karen Teegarden and Sarah Warfield Chamberlin. The raised public awareness of the issues of rape, human trafficking and violence against women. An array of legislators, journalists and celebrities participated in the campaign, including U.S. Senators Mark Warner and Tim Kaine; comedians Roseanne Barr, Margaret Cho, Annabelle Gurwitch and Lois Bromfield; social justice advocate Sandra Fluke; Philadelphia Eagles defensive tackle, Ronnie Cameron, musician Courtney Love; social and political commentators Meghan McCain, Alexandria Goddard (the Steubenville blogger), Leslie Salzillo, Kimberley A. Johnson and Tanya Tatum; Editor-in-Chief Jane Pratt; writers Mandy Stadtmiller, Alison Freer, Marci Robin and Julia Allison; actors Yuri Lowenthal, Pia Glenn and Sharon Gardner; celebrity artist Tormented Sugar; writers Herman Williams, III, Pat Bertram, Michele Rolle and Toni Morrison; executive director of the Military Rape Crisis Center, Panayiota Bertzikis; and celebrity relationship experts Dr. Gilda Carle and Dr. Sheri Meyers.

The "Unite Against Rape" team also partnered with the Rape, Abuse & Incest National Network for a national RAINN Day campaign to raise awareness of sexual assault on college campuses.

Fisher spoke on the grounds of the Washington Monument on November 9, 2014, at an event held by the Global Woman P.E.A.C.E. Foundation to help raise awareness of female genital mutilation.

== Education ==
Fisher is a 2002 graduate and Past Class Chair of the Sorensen Institute for Political Leadership at The University of Virginia and received her undergraduate degree from The College of William and Mary in 1994.

== Writings ==
Fisher's articles and essays have been published in newspapers, magazines, anthologies, news sites and blogs since the 1990s. She writes about society, politics, health, entertainment, and pop culture.

"Why ‘Slacktivism’ Matters" is an article Fisher wrote for PBS, explaining various methods of social media activism and demonstrating its potential effectiveness in raising global awareness using the #BringBackOurGirls hashtag as an example.

== Memberships ==
Fisher is a member of the National Press Club, the Society of Professional Journalists and the Online News Association. She is an alumna of the Beta Delta chapter of Alpha Chi Omega.

== Notable radio shows and podcasts ==
Show	Episode
NPC	CNN’s John King Breaks Down 2020 Election Coverage
NPC	Nonprofit News and the Vital Role it Plays
NPC	Cybersecurity for Journalists
NPC	COVID-19 Worsening Threat To Global Press Freedom
NPC	Washington Press Corps Becoming More Digital And Specialized: Pew Research Center
NPC	Exploring The Growing Popularity Of Fair Trade Products: Fairtrade America And Ben & Jerry's
NPC	By Targeting Millennials, The Young Turks Dominates Online News
NPC	Policy Makers Using Solution-Based Journalism To Effect Change: UC Berkeley Journalism for Social Change Program creator Daniel Heimpel
NPC	News Coverage and Communications Strategies for Nonprofit Organizations with two-time Edward R. Murrow Award winner, Lisa Matthews.
AOTA	Writing Horror for the Screen: Child's Play Creator Don Mancini
AOTA	Former CIA Counterterrorism Center Deputy Director Philip Mudd on CIA Black Sites
AOTA	New York Times Bestselling author Cecelia Ahern
AOTA	Vanishing of the Bees: Maryam Henein on the sudden disappearance of bees
AOTA	Economic & Racial Divides: Yale University Sociologist Dr. Elijah Anderson with Shannon Fisher
AOTA	Former Editor in Chief of Cosmopolitan Magazine and New York Times Bestselling Author Kate White
AOTA	The Fight for the Four Freedoms: Harvey J. Kaye
AOTA	HIV on Rise among Women: Marty Bond from the Office on Women's Health for the U.S. Department of Health and Human Services
AOTA	An Interview with former Senate Majority Leaders Trent Lott and Tom Daschle about their new book, Crisis Point
AOTA	Neurobiology of Trauma: Harvard Medical School's Dr. Jim Hopper
AOTA	The Words We Live By: Constitutional Scholar Linda Monk
AOTA	Dr. Maureen Petersen Talks Diabetes
AOTA	Dangers of the Essure Device
AOTA	FGM – Global Woman P.E.A.C.E. Foundation President, Angela Peabody
AOTA	NWHW – Director of the Office on Women's Health for the U.S. Department of Health and Human Services, Dr. Nancy Lee
AOTA	Beagle Freedom Project, Shannon Keith
AOTA	Gilda –Gram – Celebrity Relationship Expert, Dr. Gilda Carle
AOTA	The World Bank's Digital Communications Manager, Christine Montgomery
AOTA	How a Breast Feeding Bill Became a Law – Activist, Kate Noon
AOTA	A History of Women in Society – Historian, Renee Davis
AOTA	A Conversation about Women and Race – Moderator of The Tatum Talks, Tanya Tatum
AOTA	The State of Women's Rights in America – Terry O’Neill, President of the National Organization for Women (NOW), and Karen Teegarden, President of UniteWomen.org
AOTA	Ovarian Cancer – Survivor and Patient Advocate, Esther Windmueller
AOTA	Pink Ink – Tattoo Artist, Amy Black
AOTA	Exploring Autism
AOTA	Women in Comedy – Comedian, Lois Bromfield
AOTA	True P@rn Clerk Stories and The Second City – Writer and Comedian, Ali Davis
AOTA	Chatting or Cheating – Dr. Sheri Meyers
AOTA	Newyorican Girl – Writer and Journalist, Julia Barden
AOTA	A Global Conversation on Human and Sex Trafficking
