= UniteWomen.org =

U.S. nonprofit organization

- Founder: Karen Teegarden, Desiree Jordan
- Location: Birmingham, Michigan
- Region served: United States
- Members: 21,000
- Website: unitewomen.org
- Formerly called: Organizing Against the War on Women, Unite Women

UniteWomen.org is a national non-partisan 501(c)(3) tax exempt non-profit organization with a mission of ending inequality for women that stems from prejudice and discrimination and to defend and advance the human and civil rights of women and girls. The organization was formed in Michigan in February 2012. It developed in response to the war on women, a series of legislative actions in the United States which negatively affect women.

The group has organized several marches, including a march in Jackson, Mississippi, to oppose "32 bills introduced this session restricting women's access to health care" and a nationwide march on April 28, 2012, that took place in major cities across the United States. The group has been endorsed by American Association of University Women, National Latina Institute for Reproductive Health, the Coalition of Labor Union Women and The Coffee Party USA. The march in April 2012 was promoted by Barbara Hannah Grufferman.

Karen Teegarden, President of UniteWomen.org, appeared on The Authentic Woman, along with National Organization for Women President, Terry O'Neill. The two women's rights leaders were interviewed by radio host, Shannon Fisher, about The State of Women's Rights in America.

The organization was a partner in the Suffrage Centennial Celebration in 2013, which was a week of events in Washington leading up to a reenactment of the Woman Suffrage Parade of 1913 Other partners in the Suffrage Centennial Celebration were the National Women's History Museum, Sewall-Belmont House & Museum, the Smithsonian’s National Museum of American History, the Newseum, American Association of University Women, Daughters of the American Revolution, Delta Sigma Theta, the National Archives, the Turning Point Suffragist Memorial, the National Press Club, and The George Washington University Lisner Auditorium.

UniteWomen.org's "Unite Against Rape" campaign raised public awareness of the issues of rape, human trafficking and violence against women. An array of legislators, journalists and celebrities participated in the campaign, including U.S. Senators Mark Warner and Tim Kaine; comedians Roseanne Barr, Margaret Cho, Annabelle Gurwitch and Lois Bromfield; social justice advocate Sandra Fluke; Philadelphia Eagles defensive tackle, Ronnie Cameron, musician Courtney Love; social and political commentators Meghan McCain, Alexandria Goddard (the Steubenville blogger), Leslie Salzillo, Kimberley A. Johnson and Tanya Tatum; XoJane writers and editors Jane Pratt, Mandy Stadtmiller, Alison Freer, Marci Robin and Julia Allison; actors Yuri Lowenthal, Pia Glenn and Sharon Gardner; celebrity artist Tormented Sugar; writers Herman Williams, III, Pat Bertram, Michele Rolle and Toni Morrison; executive director of the Military Rape Crisis Center, Panayiota Bertzikis; and celebrity relationship experts Dr. Gilda Carle and Dr. Sheri Meyers. The campaign was co-founded by UniteWomen.org executive committee members Renee Davis, Karen Teegarden, Shannon Fisher and Sarah Warfield Chamberlin. The team also partnered with Rape, Abuse & Incest National Network (RAINN) for a national RAINN Day campaign to raise awareness of sexual assault on college campuses.
