= Staff (military) =

Management personnel of a military unit

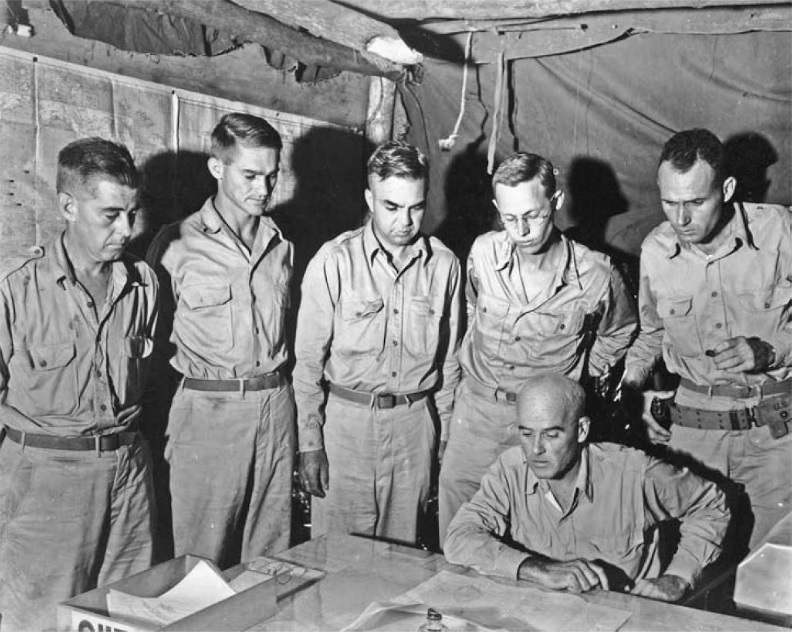
Staff meeting of the U.S. 112th Regimental Combat Team in Arawe with General Julian Cunningham (seated), standing left to right: unidentified, Lieutenant Colonel C. E. Grant, Major D. M. McMains, Colonel A. M. Miller and Lieutenant Colonel P. L. Hooper

A military staff or general staff (also referred to as army staff, navy staff, or air staff within the individual services) is a group of officers, enlisted, and civilian staff who serve the commander of a division or other large military unit in their command and control role through planning, analysis, and information gathering, as well as by relaying, coordinating, and supervising the execution of their plans and orders, especially in case of multiple simultaneous and rapidly changing complex operations. They are organised into functional groups such as administration, logistics, operations, intelligence, training, etc. They provide multi-directional flow of information between a commanding officer, subordinate military units and other stakeholders. A centralised general staff results in tighter top-down control but requires larger staff at headquarters (HQ) and reduces accuracy of orientation of field operations, whereas a decentralised general staff results in enhanced situational focus, personal initiative, speed of localised action, OODA loop, and improved accuracy of orientation.

A commander "commands" through their personal authority, decision-making and leadership, and uses general staff to exercise the "control" on their behalf in a large unit. Most NATO nations, including the United States and most European nations, use the Continental Staff System which has origin in Napoleon's military. The Commonwealth Staff System, used by most of the Commonwealth, has its origin in the British military.

== Functions ==
=== Information management ===
A primary function of a military staff is to provide accurate and timely information to support command decision-making. This information may include assessments, operational updates, and the results of contingency planning, which examines possible future situations and prepares appropriate responses. Through analysis and recommendations, the staff assists commanders in developing informed courses of action that effectively manage and conserve unit resources.

In addition to generating and analyzing information, a military staff manages the flow of communication within the unit and between external organizations. Information intended for the commander is prioritized, organized, and delivered through established channels. Relevant information that may affect subordinate units is distributed through their respective staffs to support coordination and execution. Information that does not directly apply to the unit is redirected to the appropriate command level or organization where it can be effectively utilized.

Military staffs are often among the first elements within a unit to identify issues that may affect operations. Matters that could significantly influence the unit's operational capability are elevated to the commanding officer for consideration and decision-making. However, not all issues require command-level involvement. Routine or limited-scope matters are assigned to appropriate sections or personnel within the organization for resolution, allowing commanders to focus on higher-priority decisions and responsibilities.

A military staff also plays a role in identifying, developing, and utilizing opportunities or situations that may contribute to mission success. By collecting, evaluating, and applying relevant information, the staff supports planning, coordination, and the effective employment of unit capabilities.

=== Structure ===
In a generic command staff, more seasoned and senior officers oversee staff sections of groups organized by the needs of the unit. Senior Enlisted Personnel task personnel in the maintenance of tactical equipment and vehicles. Senior Analysts are tasked with the finalizing of reports, and their enlisted personnel participate in the acquisition of information from subordinate staffs and units. This hierarchy places decision making and reporting under the auspices of the most experienced personnel and maximizes information flow of pertinent information sent out of the command overall, clarifying matters overall. This frees up the most senior members of the command at each level for decision making and issuing direction for further research or information gathering (perhaps requiring men to put their lives at risk to gather additional intelligence).

== History ==
Prior to the late 18th century, there was generally no organizational support for staff functions such as military intelligence, logistics, planning or personnel. Unit commanders handled such functions for their units, with informal help from subordinates who were usually not trained for or assigned to a specific task.

=== Austria ===
Count Leopold Joseph von Daun, in a letter to Empress Maria Theresa in January 1758, pressed for a more important role for the Generalquartiermeister (Chief of Staff). The failures in the army, especially at the Battle of Leuthen made it clear that Austria had no "great brain" and the command needed to spread the workload to allow the Commander-in-chief the time to consider the strategic picture. The 1757 regulations had created the Grosse Feldgeneralstab and Kleine Generalstab (large and small general staff) and after changes in 1769, a permanent staff of 30 officers was established under the direction of Franz Moritz von Lacy, which would be expanded in wartime with junior officers. The Grosse staff was divided into three: First, the Intrinsecum, which handled internal administration and directing operations; secondly, external activities, including the Pioneers; thirdly, the Inspection Service, which handled the issuing of orders and prisoners of war. Alongside the General Staff was the General Adjutant, who led a group of Adjutant staff selected by the army commanders to handle the details of internal administration and collating intelligence, and answered to the Commander-in-chief. The Chief of Staff became the chief adviser to the Commander-in-chief and, in a fundamental move away from the previous administrative role, the Chief of Staff now undertook operational planning, while delegating the routine work to his senior staff officers. Staff officers were drawn from line units and would later return to them, the intention being that they would prove themselves as leaders during their time with the staff. In a battle or when the army had detached corps, a small number of staff would be allocated to the column commander as a smaller version of headquarters. The senior man, usually a Major, would be the chief of the column staff and his principal task would be to help the commander to understand what was intended.

When Karl Mack von Leiberich became chief of staff of the army under Prince Josias of Saxe-Coburg-Saalfeld in the Netherlands, he issued the Instruktionspunkte für gesammte Herren Generals, the last of 19 points setting out the roles of staff officers, dealing with offensive and defensive operations, while helping the Commander-in-chief. In 1796, Archduke Charles, Duke of Teschen augmented these with his own Observationspunkte, writing of the Chief of Staff: "he is duty bound to consider all possibilities related to operations and not view himself as merely carrying out those instructions". On 20 March 1801, Feldmarschalleutnant Peter Duka von Kadar became the world's first peacetime Generalquartiermeister at the head of the staff and the wartime role of the Chief of Staff was now focused on planning and operations to assist the Commander. Archduke Charles, Duke of Teschen himself produced a new Dienstvorschrift on 1 September 1805, which divided the staff into three: 1) Political Correspondence; 2) the Operations Directorate, dealing with planning and intelligence; 3) the Service Directorate, dealing with administration, supply and military justice. The Archduke set out the position of a modern Chief of Staff: "The Chief of Staff stands at the side of the Commander-in-Chief and is completely at his disposal. His sphere of work connects him with no specific unit". "The Commander-in-Chief decides what should happen and how; his chief assistant works out these decisions, so that each subordinate understands his allotted task". With the creation of the Korps in 1809, each had a staff, whose chief was responsible for directing operations and executing the overall headquarters plan. The staff on the outbreak of war in 1809 numbered over 170. Finally in 1811, Joseph Radetzky von Radetz produced his Über die bessere Einrichtung des Generalstabs, which prioritised the Chief of Staff's managerial and supervisory role with the departments (Political Correspondence, Operations and Service) under their own directors, effectively merging the Adjutants and General Staff officers. In this system lay the beginnings of a formal staff corps, whose members could specialise in operations, intelligence and logistics.

=== France ===
Despite a short lived permanent staff under St-Cyr (1783–90), the French reverted to the old system in 1790, when the Revolutionary Government abolished the staff corps. When General Louis Alexandre Berthier was appointed Chief of Staff to the French Army of Italy in 1795, his was the old administrative role, accurately described by Jomini and Vachee as "the chief clerk" and "of limited competence". His manual is merely a reporting system as a kind of office manual. Staff officers were rotated out of the line on the Austrian model, but received no training and merely became efficient in the administrative tasks, especially the rapid issuance of orders. It suited Napoleon Bonaparte from the moment he took over the army the following year and he would use Berthier's system throughout his wars. Crucially, Napoleon remained his own intelligence chief and operational planner, a workload which, ultimately, not even he could cope with.

=== Germany ===
==== Prussia ====
Prussia adopted Austria's approach in the following years, especially when Gerhard von Scharnhorst, who as a Hanoverian staff officer had worked with the Austrian army in the Austrian Netherlands in the early 1790s, took charge. Initially, the Prussian Army assigned a limited number of technical expert officers to support field commanders. Before 1746, however, reforms had added management of intelligence and contingency planning to the staff's duties. Later, the practice was initiated of rotating officers from command to staff assignments and back to familiarize them with both aspects of military operations, a practice that, with the addition of enlisted personnel, continues to be used. After 1806, Prussia's military academies trained mid-level officers in specialist staff skills. In 1814, Prussia formally established by law a central military command—Prussian General Staff—and a separate staff for each division and corps. Despite some professional and political issues with the Prussian system, especially when viewed through the prism of the 20th century World Wars, their General Staff concept has been adopted by many large armies in existence today.

==== Nazi Luftwaffe ====
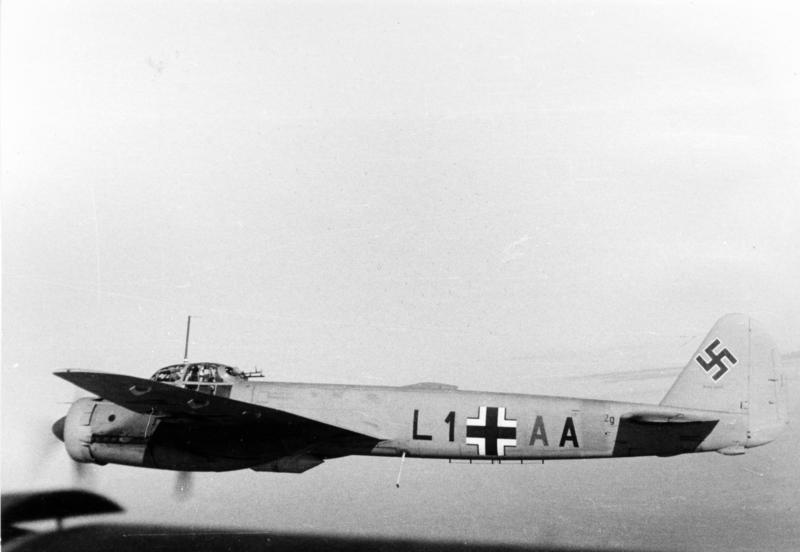
A Ju 88A of LG 1's Geschwader Stab flight bearing a blue "A" as the third letter per Luftwaffe regulation.

The German language term Stab (literal translation: "staff") was used during World War II to designate a headquarters unit of the German Luftwaffe (air force). There were Stab units at the level of a Gruppe or Geschwader – units that were equivalent to wings and groups in the air forces of the English-speaking world. Stab units directly controlled aircraft as well as controlling those belonging to subordinate units.

These command units used the mandated blue or green "staff aircraft" colour for the third character (the individual aircraft's letter) of their alphanumeric Geschwaderkennung wing code, to distinguish their aircraft from the rest of air units in the same unit. These units were divided in the following form, for the fourth and last character normally used to distinguish individual Staffeln (squadrons) from the letter "H" onwards in Luftwaffe wing codes:

- Geschwader Stab = A (third letter blue)
- Stab I Gruppe ("Staff Unit, I Group") = B (third letter green)
- Stab II Gruppe = C (third letter green)
- Stab III Gruppe = D (third letter green)
- Stab IV Gruppe = F (third letter green)
- Stab V Gruppe = G (third letter green)

On some occasions they also used letters Q, I, J, W and others, or numbers, but these were used less commonly. As day fighter Jagdgeschwader combat wings did not use the Geschwaderkennung four-character alphanumeric code system for aircraft identification, as one example, the all-jet Jagdgeschwader 7 Nowotny and piston-engined Jagdgeschwader 300 Wilde Sau fighter wings, these used the red-blue or blue-white-blue Reich Defense (German Reich metropolitan defense) rear fuselage bands of 90 cm total width respectively, for their Stabsschwarm units. Under the cockpit, the rank of the air commander might have been indicated via a rank sign, with or without additional letters as mentioned above.

For example:

- An airplane codified "A", green in colour, with D/St.III/St.G.77, indicated it was a member of Stab III of Stukageschwader (Dive Bomber Wing) No. 77.
- An airplane codified "G", green in colour, with a little white tank (Panzer) painting near the cockpit, and S.G. 1, indicated it was a member of Stab of Schlachtgeschwader (Ground Attack Wing) no. 1.

=== United Kingdom ===
Before the Crimean War staff work was looked at "with great disdain" in the British Army; the hardships of that war caused by disorganization led to a change in attitude. The General Staff in Britain was formed in 1905, and reorganized again in 1908. Unlike the Prussian staff system, the British Army was thought too small to support separate staff and command career streams. Officers would typically alternate between staff and command. Beevor, Inside the British Army, says instead that the terrible cleavages between staff and line units caused by the enormous losses during the trench warfare of the World War I meant that senior British officers consequently decided that all officers would rotate between staff and line responsibilities, preventing the development of a separate general staff corps.

=== United States ===
The National Security Act of 1947 instead created a Joint Staff populated by military service members who, rather than becoming career staff officers on the German general staff model, rotate into (and back out of) joint staff positions. Following the major revision of Title 10 of the United States Code by the Goldwater–Nichols Act in 1986, the Joint Staff of today works directly for the chairman of the Joint Chiefs of Staff rather than the corporate Joint Chiefs of Staff, as they did from 1947 to 1986. Under this scheme, operational command and control of military forces are not the province of the Joint Staff, but that of combatant commanders, who report through the chairman of the Joint Chiefs of Staff unless otherwise directed, to the secretary of defense.

== Continental Staff System ==
The "Continental Staff System", also known as the "General Staff System" (GSS), is used by most NATO countries in structuring their militaries' staff functions. In this system, which is based on one originally employed by the French Army in the 19th century, each staff position in a headquarters or unit is assigned a letter-prefix corresponding to the formation's element and one or more numbers specifying a role.

The staff numbers are assigned according to custom, not hierarchy, traceable back to French practice; i.e., 1 is not "higher ranking" than 2. This list reflects the SHAPE structure:

- 1, for manpower or personnel
- 2, for intelligence and security
- 3, for operations
- 4, for logistics
- 5, for plans
- 6, for signals (i.e., communications or IT)
- 7, for military education and training (also the joint engineer)
- 8, for finance and contracts. Also known as resource management.
- 9, for Civil-Military Co-operation (CIMIC) or civil affairs.

Since the original continental staff system only covered branches 1 through 6, it is not uncommon to see 7 through 9 omitted or having various meanings. Common variation include merging of 3 and 5 to 3, Operations and Plans; omitting the training branch and utilizing 7 for engineering (as seen in US Military Sealift Command and Multinational Forces-Iraq (MNF-I)) and replacing 9 with a legal branch (making CIMIC a part of another branch, i.e. 2 or 4) as seen with the UK Permanent Joint Headquarters.

Derived from the Prussian Große Generalstab (Great General Staff), traditionally these staff functions were prefixed by the simple G, which is retained in place for modern army usage. However, the increasing complexity of modern armies and the spread of the staff concept to naval, air, and other elements, has demanded the addition of new prefixes. These element prefixes are:

- A, for air force headquarters;
- C, for combined headquarters (multiple nations) headquarters;
- F, for certain forward or deployable headquarters;
- G, for army or marine general staff sections within headquarters of organizations commanded by a general officer and having a chief of staff to coordinate the actions of the general staff, such as divisions or equivalent organizations (e.g., USMC Marine Aircraft Wing and Marine Logistics Group) and separate (i.e., non-divisional) brigade level (USMC MEB) and above;
- J, for joint (multiple services) headquarters, including the Joint Chiefs of Staff);
- M, for Marine Corps headquarters;
- N, for navy headquarters;
- S, for army or marines executive staff sections within headquarters of organizations commanded by a field grade officer (i.e., major through colonel) and having an executive officer to coordinate the actions of the executive staff (e.g., divisional brigades, regiments, groups, battalions, and squadrons; not used by all countries); S is also used in the Naval Mobile Construction Battalions (SeaBees) and in the Air Force Security Forces Squadron.
- U, is used for United Nations military operations mission headquarters.
- CG, is unique to the US Coast Guard's Assistant Commandants (Headquarters staff), previously using the G prefix.

On some occasions the letter E can also be observed, though it is not an official term. In that case it is for element and it will be used to identify a small independent element, that is a part of a non-staff organization; i.e., an E3 is an operational element on a logistics site or an E4 is a logistics element on a forward medical support site.

Thus, the personnel officer of a naval headquarters would be referred to as N1. In reality, in large organizations each of these staff functions will require the support of its own large staff, so N1 refers both to the office and the officer in charge of it. The continental staff system can be carried down to the next level: J1.3 (or J13, sometimes the dot-separator is omitted) is thus the operations officer of the personnel office of a joint headquarters, but the exact definition of the roles at this level may vary. Below this, numbers can be attached following a hyphen, but these are usually only positional numbers assigned arbitrarily to identify individuals (G2.3-2 could be the budget officer in the operations section of the intelligence department; A1.1-1-1 might simply be a receptionist).

=== Manpower or personnel ===
The manpower or personnel officer supervises personnel and administration systems. This department functions as the essential administrative liaison between the subordinate units and the headquarters, handling personnel actions coming from the bottom up (such as a request for an award to be given to a particular soldier) or from the top down (such as orders being received from the army level directing that a particular soldier be reassigned to a new unit outside the command). In army units, this person is often called the Adjutant. The S-1 also works with the postal mailing office, and deals with awards and ranks as well.

=== Intelligence, security, and information operations ===
The intelligence section is responsible for collecting and analyzing intelligence information about the enemy to determine what the enemy is doing or might do, to prevent the accomplishment of the enemy's mission. This office may also control maps and geographical information systems and data. At the unit level, the S-2 is the unit's security officer, and the S-2 section manages all security clearance issues for the unit's personnel. Other duties of the S-2 often include intelligence oversight and physical security.

=== Operations ===
The operations office may include plans and training. The operations office plans and coordinates operations, and all things necessary to enable the formation to operate and accomplish its mission. In most units, the operations office is the largest of the staff sections and considered the most important. All aspects of sustaining the unit's operations, planning future operations, and additionally planning and executing all unit training, fall under the responsibility of operations. The operations office is also tasked with keeping track of the weekly training schedules. In most military units (i.e., battalion, regiment, and brigade), the operations officer carries the same rank as the executive officer (XO), but ranks third in the unit's chain of command while the other staff officers are one rank lower. For example, in a battalion, the S-3 would hold the rank of major (like the battalion XO), while the remaining staff officers are captains or lieutenants.

=== Logistics ===
The logistics office is responsible for managing the wide scope of materiel, transport, facilities, services and medical/health support:

- Design, development, acquisition, storage, distribution, maintenance, evacuation, and disposition of materiel.
- Transport of personnel and materiel.
- Acquisition or construction, maintenance, operation, and disposition of facilities.
- Acquisition or furnishing of services.
- Medical and health service support.

By NATO doctrine, the logistic staff is tasked with overseeing logistic aspects and principles, where the focus is that "logistic support must be focused towards ensuring the success of the operation" and prescriptions of elements such as responsibility and authority. A logistic staff may be divided into sections based on branch or geographic area. Each section may in turn also be divided into tasks and roles. The size of the logistic staff can vary greatly, depending on the environment and complexity of operations. NATO in example work with a "Multinational Joint Logistic Centre", which exists outside of the force commander's staff, but runs as a separate entity/unit, with only a few logistic personnel in the commander's staff who act as liaisons.

=== Plans and strategy ===
The plans and strategy office is responsible for civil military operations (CMO) strategy planning. At the unit level, the S-5 is the primary adviser to the commander on the civilian-to-military and military-to-civilian impact of the mission/operation within the host nation's (HN) area of interest (AOI), area of operations (AO), or the target area of interest (TAOI). The G5 serves as the mission support office (MSO) at the division level and HHC for civil military plans and strategy.

=== Signal (communications and IT) ===
The signal office directs all communications and is the point of contact for the issue of communications instructions and protocol during operations as well as for communications troubleshooting, issue, and preventive maintenance. Communications at this level is paired with digital as well as voice (radio, computer, etc.). At the unit level, S-6 is also usually responsible for all electronic systems within a unit to include computers, faxes, copy machines, and phone systems.

=== Training ===
The training branch will organize and coordinate training activity conducted by a Headquarters and also supervise and support subordinate units.

=== Finance ===
The finance branch, not to be confused with Administration from which it has split, sets the finance policy for the operation. Operationally, the Administration and Finance may be interlinked, but have separate reporting chains.

=== CIMIC: Civil-Military Co-operation ===
Civil-Military Co-operation or civil affairs are the activities that establish, maintain, influence, or exploit relations between the military forces, the government or non-government civilian organizations and authorities, and the civilian populace in a friendly, neutral, or hostile area of operations in order to facilitate military operations and consolidate and achieve mission objectives.

== Commonwealth staff system ==
The "Commonwealth staff system", used by most Commonwealth nations, is largely based on the British military's staff system with nation-specific variations.

=== By country ===
==== Myanmar ====
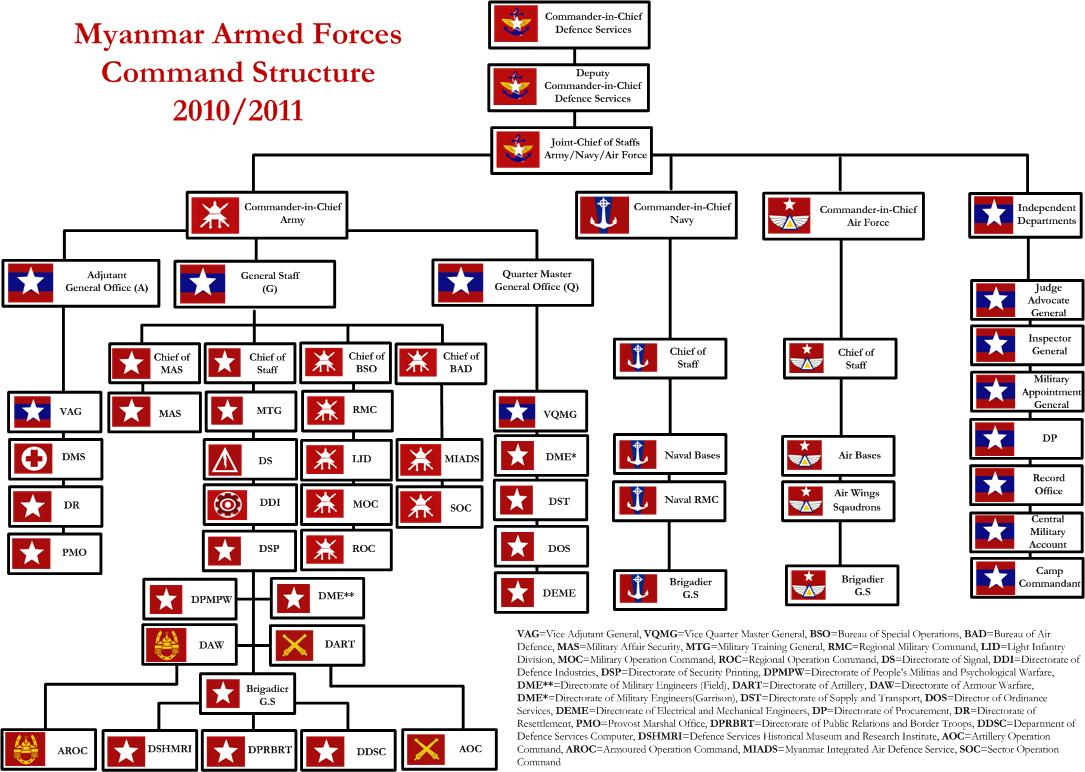
Example of a Commonwealth style command structure organisation

Overall staff system structure is generally similar to the pre 1984 British Army system with G Branch, A Branch and Q Branch with slightly different staff officer position names. Unlike the continental system, 1 is higher ranking than 2 followed by 3. Despite being called GSO, ASO and QSO in English, all of them are translated as either စစ်ဦးစီးမှူး for G (or) ဦးစီးအရာရှိ for A and Q in Burmese. The 2010/2011 military command structure of Myanmar in the photo shown below which still uses the same staff system

===== G Branch (စစ်ဦးစီး) =====
G Branch, called စစ်ဦးစီး or ဦး for short in Burmese, is responsible for Responsible for intelligence, training and every aspect of operations.

General Staff Officer (Grade 1), informally known as G1: Ranked Lieutenant Colonel or a Colonel

General Staff Officer (Grade 2), informally known as G2: Ranked Major

General Staff Officer (Grade 3), informally known as G3: Ranked Captain

===== A Branch (စစ်ရေး) =====
A Branch, called စစ်ရေး or ရေး for short in Burmese, is responsible for every aspect of personnel management such as medical and military.

Adjutant Staff Officer (Grade 1), informally known as A1: Ranked Lieutenant Colonel or a Colonel

Adjutant Staff Officer (Grade 2), informally known as A2: Ranked Major

Adjutant Staff Officer (Grade 3), informally known as A3: Ranked Captain

===== Q Branch (စစ်ထောက်) =====
Q Branch, called စစ်ထောက် or ထောက် for short in Burmese, is responsible for logistical aspects such as supply and transport as well as ordnance service.

Quartermaster Staff Officer (Grade 1), informally known as Q1: Ranked Lieutenant Colonel or a Colonel

Quartermaster Staff Officer (Grade 2), informally known as Q2: Ranked Major

Quartermaster Staff Officer (Grade 3), informally known as Q3: Ranked Captain

==== Australia ====
Following Australia's Federation in 1901, the Australian Commonwealth Military Forces (now the Australian Army) adopted many of the practices of the British Army, including its staff system. While this approach was modified and adapted over the course of the 20th Century, the British three branch system and nomenclature remained a feature of Australian practice until 1997 when it adopted the Common Joint Staff System, based on the NATO or Continental/General Staff System, across all three services. The primary reasons given for this were the ability to standardise staff organisations across the breadth and depth of the services, and; improve interoperability between America, Britain, Canada and Australia, as well as NATO partners that employed this system. At this time the Australian Defence Force also developed its own Joint Military Appreciation Process (JMAP), itself derived from the US Tactical Decision-Making Process and UK Individual Estimate.

==== Canada ====
The head of the Royal Canadian Navy, Commander of the Royal Canadian Navy, is also titled as Chief of Naval Staff.

The head of the Royal Canadian Air Force, Commander of the Royal Canadian Air Force, is also titled as Chief of Air Force Staff.

The head of the Canadian Army, Commander of the Canadian Army, is also titled as Chief of Army Staff.

==== United Kingdom ====
===== Army staff =====
The British Staff System was a product of the Esher Committee Report of 1904, which investigated the conduct of the late Victorian era British Army in the Second Anglo-Boer War and the Haldane Reforms from 1906–1912. This staff system was captured in Field Service Regulations, Part II, Organisation and Administration, released in 1909 and later in the Staff Manual 1912. This system remained in use until 1984, when the United Kingdom began to use the Continental or NATO system. The British Staff System was based on the following:

- Three branches:
  - G branch: The general branch, responsible for operations, intelligence and training.
  - A branch: The administration branch, responsible for all aspects of personnel management.
  - Q branch: The quartermaster branch, responsible for logistic and equipment support.
- Positions: positions were labelled as follows, may also be styled GSO I, GSO II, GSO III:
  - GSO1, General Staff Officer (Grade 1): The chief of staff, ranked a lieutenant colonel or colonel. He was in charge of the general staff branch, responsible for training, intelligence, planning operations and directing the battle as it progressed. Most orders from the general officer commanding (GOC) were actually written up and signed by the GSO1.
  - GSO2, General Staff Officer (Grade 2): Ranked a major.
  - GSO3, General Staff Officer (Grade 3): Ranked a captain.

In the British system, staff are outranked by command officers. The staff cannot in theory (and largely in practice) say "no" to a subordinate unit; only the commander has that ability. This ensured a clear chain of command, and reinforced the idea that staff do not command, but exercise control on behalf of their commander. By contrast, in the American system, commanders are frequently outranked by staff officers. For example, within an American-style battalion, the S-3 is a major while company commanders are captains. In the British system, the principal staff officers at any HQ were always outranked by the subordinate commanders:

- Lieutenant colonels commanding battalions or units in a brigade outrank the brigade major and the deputy assistant adjutant and quartermaster general
- Brigadiers commanding brigades in a division outrank the colonel GS and colonel AQ
- Major generals commanding divisions outrank the brigadier GS and assistant adjutant general and assistant quartermaster general at a corps HQ

====== Brigade level ======
Branches as brigade were as follows. A and Q branches might be combined under a deputy assistant adjutant and quartermaster general, rank major (DAA&QMG).

- G branch (operations) plans and executes operations.
  The senior staff officer in brigade HQ held the appointment of brigade major (BM) with rank of captain or major, who coordinated the HQ. While the BM was responsible for the entire HQ, he concentrated mainly on "G" operational matters. A deputy BM GSO III generally looked after non-operational matters. Under the BM were several GSO III (rank captain) officers:
  - Operations (the senior captain)
  - Intelligence
  - Liaison. The Liaison section often had several lieutenants attached from the brigade's combat units.
  - Air
- A branch:
  It handled all personnel matters such as awards, postings, promotions, medical, chaplains, military police and so forth. There were usually one or two GSO III officers in A branch.
- Q Branch:
  It handled logistics, supply, transport, clothing, maintenance. There was usually one GSO III officer, with a learner captain or lieutenant, and several advisors, all captains:
  - Brigade Royal Army Service Corps Officer (BRASCO)
  - Brigade Ordnance Officer (BOO)
  - Brigade Electrical and Mechanical Engineer Officer (BEME)

====== Division level ======
G branch was under the colonel GS (a lieutenant-colonel).

The combined "A" and "Q" staffs was headed by a colonel AQ, who was assisted by an assistant adjutant and quartermaster general (AA&QMG, rank lieutenant-colonel).

Members of the G staff:

- A GSO II, acting as deputy to the GSO I. He was responsible for the preparation of orders and instructions as directed by the GSO I; the general organization and working of the "G" office; detailing of duty officers at the Div HQ; coordinating arrangements for moving the Main HQ; details of movement by road in consultation with the DAAG and DAQMG; and general policy regarding HQ defence and the preparation and promulgation of HQ standing orders. (In an armoured division headquarters, the GSO II was responsible for the division tactical HQ and the above duties were done by the GSO III (Operations).)
- The GSO III (Operations) was the understudy to the GSO II; he maintained the situation map; prepared situation reports; supervised the acknowledgement register; maintained the command matrix; prepared orders for the move of the orders group; and prepared orders for the move of the division's main HQ.
- The GSO III (Operations)(Chemical Warfare) was responsible for all matters dealing with chemical warfare that affected the division; coordinated courses; was responsible for the camouflage policy; maintained the war diary; prepared and maintained location statements; received and distributed codes, call sign lists and other signals information from the divisional signals; coordinated traffic control and organization of routes in the divisional forward area under the GSO II and APM; was understudy to the GSO III (Operations) on all matters less CW.
- The GSO III (Intelligence) coordinated all intelligence training and work in the division; coordinated the collection and collation of information about enemy dispositions, methods and intentions; prepared daily intelligence summaries; coordinated interpretation of air photographs with the Army Photographic Interpretation Section (APIS); effected liaison with the APIS, the field security office and the Intelligence Officer, Royal Artillery (at CRA); and was responsible for briefing and handling of press correspondents.
- The GSO III (Liaison) coordinated the work of the liaison officers, was responsible for the division information room and served as an understudy to the GSO III (Operations).

====== Corps level ======
G branch was headed by the brigadier general staff (BGS, rank: brigadier). The BGS was usually superior to the AAG and AQMG, despite all three having the same rank.

A branch was headed by the Assistant adjutant general (AAG, rank: brigadier). He was assisted by the deputy assistant adjutant general (DAAG, rank lieutenant-colonel).

Q branch was headed by the assistant quartermaster general (AQMG, rank: brigadier).

The G staff for a corps might appear as below:

- Operations and staff duties:
  - GSO I
  - GSO II (Ops)
  - GSO II (Ops)(CW)
  - GSO II (SD) – Staff Duties
  - 2 × GSO III (SD)
- Air:
  - GSO II (Air)
- Intelligence:
  - GSO II (Int)
  - 2 × GSO III (Int)
- Liaison:
  - GSO II (L)
  - 3 × GSO III (L)
- Royal Artillery:
  - GSO II (RA)
  - GSO II (AA)
  - GSO III (RA)

===== Naval staff =====
The Admiralty War Staff was a former senior command, operational planning department within the Admiralty during World War I. It was instituted on 8 January 1912 and was in effect a war council whose head reported directly to the First Sea Lord. It existed until 1917. After the war ended, it was replaced by the Admiralty Naval Staff department.

The Admiralty Naval Staff was the senior command, operational planning, policy and strategy department within the British Admiralty. It was established in 1917 and existed until 1964 when the department of the Admiralty was abolished and was replaced by the Naval Staff, Navy Department (Ministry of Defence).

== See also ==
- Staff college
