= Director of Operations =

Director of Operations or Directorate of Operations may refer to:

- Chief operating officer, in business
- Operations director, in business
- Operations Directorate, in the General Staff of the Israel Defense Forces
- Directorate of Operations (CIA), United States
- Directorate of Operations (DIA), United States
- Director of Operations Division, a former role in the Royal Navy

== See also ==
- Operation Director, the Battle of Arawe between Allied and Japanese forces in World War II
- Director of Floor Operations, in the United States House of Representatives
- Deputy Director of the CIA for Operations
- Director of Operations and Intelligence, a former title of the Deputy Chief of the Air Staff (United Kingdom)
- Director of Operations, Planning and Development for Military Commissions, United States
