= Special Service Unit No. 1 =

Joint U.S.-Australia Unit active in World War II

Special Services Unit No. 1 (SSU 1) was a short lived special forces unit during World War II. A combined operations unit, it included both US and Australian personnel. SSU 1 undertook amphibious reconnaissance missions, to gather intelligence about proposed amphibious landing sites.

Formed in July 1943, SSU 1 trained initially at Cairns, Australia, in martial arts, hand-to-hand combat, rubber craft operation, jungle survival training, pidgin English, map making, oceanography and marine biology (i.e. recognizing underwater coral formations and other sea creatures).

In August 1943, SSU 1 moved to Fergusson Island, New Guinea, and in November, the unit relocated to Milne Bay.

Missions were undertaken at Finschhafen, Arawe, Gasmata and Cape Gloucester, without any casualties.

Following disputes between the various services involved regarding operational matters, many of the personnel transferred to other units. In December 1943, the remainder returned to their respective services.

US Navy personnel from SSU 1 subsequently became the basis of the 7th Amphibious Scouts.
