= USS YMS-50 =

Minesweeper of the United States Navy

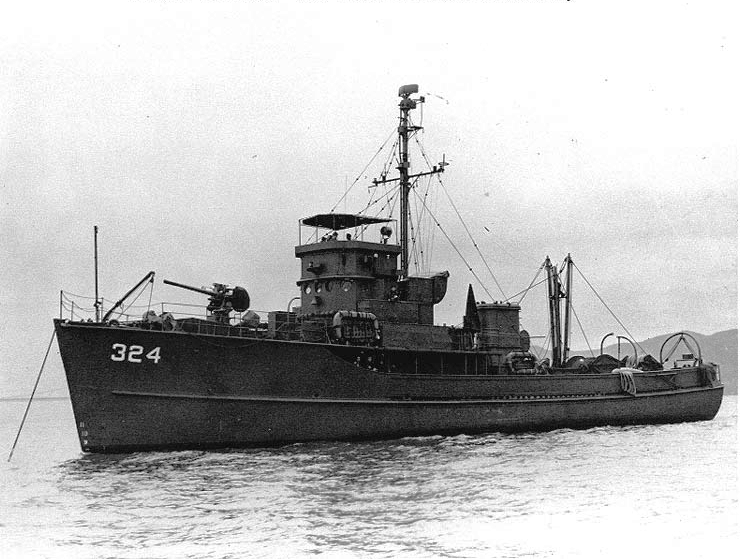
- A YMS-1-class minesweeper

History

United States
- Name: USS YMS-50
- Builder: Wheeler Shipbuilding Corp, Whitestone, Long Island, New York
- Laid down: 16 July 1941
- Launched: 6 June 1942
- Completed: 3 August 1942
- Fate: Sunk, 18 June 1945

General characteristics
- Class & type: YMS-1-class minesweeper
- Displacement: 320 long tons (325 t)
- Length: 136 ft (41 m)
- Beam: 24 ft 6 in (7.47 m)
- Draft: 6 ft 1 in (1.85 m)
- Propulsion: 2 × General Motors diesel engines, two shafts.
- Speed: 13 knots (24 km/h; 15 mph)
- Complement: 33
- Armament: 1 × 3"/50 caliber gun; 2 × 20 mm guns; 2 × Depth charge tracks; 2 × Depth charge projectors

USS YMS-50 was a United States Navy YMS-1-class auxiliary motor minesweeper during World War II. Laid down on 16 July 1941 at Wheeler Shipbuilding Corp., Whitestone, Long Island, New York, she was launched on 6 June 1942 and commissioned on 3 August. Assigned to the South West Pacific Area, she was damaged by a dive bomber while covering the landings during the battle of Arawe, New Britain on 17 December 1943. Later while covering the landings during the battle of Balikpapan, Borneo she struck a mine on 18 June 1945 at 01°18′S 116°49′E and was scuttled by the light cruiser Denver.
