= USS SC-742 =

History

United States
- Name: USS SC-742
- Builder: Julius Petersen Inc., Nyack, New York
- Laid down: 22 April 1942
- Launched: 17 August 1942
- Commissioned: 1 January 1943
- Fate: Transferred to the Philippines, 2 July 1948

Philippines
- Acquired: 2 July 1948
- Status: Unknown

General characteristics
- Class & type: SC-497-class submarine chaser
- Displacement: 95 long tons (97 t)
- Length: 110 ft 10 in (33.78 m)
- Beam: 17 ft (5.2 m)
- Draft: 6 ft 6 in (1.98 m) (full)
- Propulsion: 2 × General Motors 8-268A diesel engines; Snow and Knobstedt single reduction gear; 2 shafts.
- Speed: 15.6 knots (28.9 km/h; 18.0 mph)
- Complement: 28 officers and enlisted
- Armament: 1 × 40 mm gun mount; 1 or 2 × twin .50 cal (12.7 mm) machine guns; 2 or 3 × depth charge projectors ("K-guns"); 14 × depth charges with six single release chocks; 2 × Mk.20 Mousetrap rails with four 7.2 in (180 mm) projectiles

USS SC-742 was a United States Navy SC-497-class submarine chaser which after service during World War II was transferred to the Philippine Navy in 1948.

Laid down on 22 April 1942 at Julius Petersen Inc., Nyack, New York and launched on 17 August 1942 and commissioned on 1 January 1943. Initially allocated to the Atlantic Fleet, she picked up survivors from the American tanker Virginia Sinclair off Cape Maisí, Cuba that was torpedoed and sunk by the U-185.

Transferred to the Pacific Fleet, she participated in the landings during the battle of Arawe and later the during the Philippines campaign. She was transferred to the Philippine Navy on 2 July 1948.
