= USS SC-743 =

History

United States
- Name: USS SC-743
- Builder: Julius Petersen Inc., Nyack, New York
- Laid down: 24 April 1942
- Launched: 26 August 1942
- Commissioned: 27 February 1943
- Fate: Transferred to the Philippines, 2 July 1948

Philippines
- Acquired: 2 July 1948
- Status: Unknown

General characteristics
- Class & type: SC-497-class submarine chaser
- Displacement: 95 long tons (97 t)
- Length: 110 ft 10 in (33.78 m)
- Beam: 17 ft (5.2 m)
- Draft: 6 ft 6 in (1.98 m) (full)
- Propulsion: 2 × General Motors 8-268A diesel engines; Snow and Knobstedt single reduction gear; 2 shafts.
- Speed: 15.6 knots (28.9 km/h; 18.0 mph)
- Complement: 28 officers and enlisted
- Armament: 1 × 40 mm gun mount; 1 or 2 × twin .50 cal (12.7 mm) machine guns; 2 or 3 × depth charge projectors ("K-guns"); 14 × depth charges with six single release chocks; 2 × Mk.20 Mousetrap rails with four 7.2 in (180 mm) projectiles

USS SC-743 was a United States Navy SC-497-class submarine chaser which after service during World War II was transferred to the Philippine Navy in 1948.

The ship was laid down on 24 April 1942 at Julius Petersen Inc., Nyack, New York, launched on 26 August 1942, and commissioned on 27 February 1943. Assigned to the South West Pacific Area she was damaged by a dive bomber while covering the landings during the battle of Arawe, New Britain on 17 December 1943. She was transferred to the Philippine Navy on 2 July 1948.
