= Cape Peiho =

Cape in Papua New Guinea

Cape Peiho is located on the south coast of New Britain in the West New Britain Province 32 kilometres (20 mi) west of Arawe, Papua New Guinea.
