= Barbara Hannah Grufferman =

American writer

- Occupations: Author, Journalist

Barbara Hannah Grufferman is an author and journalist. She is a regular contributor to the Huffington Post. Grufferman is the author of "The Best of Everything After 50: The Experts' Guide to Style, Sex, Health, Money, and More," which purports to address concerns of women over fifty. In writing the book, she consulted with experts in different fields, including Diane von Fürstenberg, Frédéric Fekkai, Dr. Patricia Wexler.

== Biography ==
Grufferman lives in New York City with her husband, Howard, and two teenaged daughters.

She attended St. John's University, and then New York University for graduate studies in Social Anthropology, Grufferman worked in magazine publishing for 20 years. She then joined a publishing company as Group Publisher.

Later she joined World Congress LLP, an international conference company which focused on infrastructure needs and projects in developing countries, as President. In 1997, World Congress hosted the first major meeting in Hong Kong after the island's historic return to China, and Grufferman was featured in Hong Kong's major newspapers, as well as on radio and television.

Gufferman launched her book "The Best of Everything After 50: The Experts' Guide to Style, Sex, Health, Money, and More," in early April 2010. Since then, Grufferman has appeared on The Today Show, Good Morning America Health, and numerous radio and internet programs. She also gives presentations promoting the ideas and concepts in her book.

Grufferman is a founding board member of RX Compassion, Inc., a not-for-profit corporation dedicated to building compassion in the health care field through education, programs and awareness.
