= Itni River =

Coordinates: 5.7300°S 148.5136°E

The Itni River is a river in the West New Britain Province of New Britain. It is approximately 19.404 miles long. The river flows through dense tropical forests.
