= Panayiota Bertzikis =

US Coast Guard veteran

- Born: December 7, 1981 (age 44); Thessaloniki, Greece
- Military career
- Allegiance: United States
- Branch: United States Coast Guard

Panayiota Bertzikis is an author, public speaker, and women's rights activist.

== Life and works ==
Panayiota Bertzikis is a United States Coast Guard veteran who founded the Military Rape Crisis Center in August 2006 while she was still on active duty. The Military Rape Crisis Center provides medical advocacy, support groups, legal services, case management, community education, and professional training to victims of military sexual trauma while fighting gender-based violence.

Bertzikis made claims of being sexually assaulted by a shipmate while serving in the United States Coast Guard in Burlington, Vermont and saw a lack of support and no substantial steps being made to investigate the matter from the authorities after her assault. After her discharge from the Coast Guard for failure to adjust, she was awarded the Unsung Heroines of Massachusetts award by the Massachusetts Commission on the Status of Women in May 2010.

Bertzikis is also the founder of the International Center for Survivor Justice, which works to provide financial support for survivors and advance accountability for women abroad who were subjected to sexual violence by members of the United States Armed Forces.

Bertzikis also runs the blog mydutytospeak.com.

== See also ==
- UniteWomen.org
