= Director of Floor Operations =

Title of two staff members in the US House of Representatives

Director of Floor Operations is the title of two staff members in the United States House of Representatives, with the majority director in the speaker's office and the minority director in the minority leader's or minority whip's office. Each director is primarily responsible for informally counting votes and ascertaining the support of their party's members of Congress for particular legislation prior to recorded votes.

Another responsibility of the role is persuading Members of Congress from their party to vote along with their party's Leadership, even when it is unpopular. They may also be charged with coordinating outreach to allied groups of lobbyists, corporations, or unions.

During the 112th Congress (2011–2012), the majority director of floor operations (for the Republicans) was Anne Thorsen and the minority director of floor operations (for the Democrats) was Jerry Hartz.

The director can also have a deputy, who assists with counting votes and running the floor. During the 111th Congress (2009–2010), the majority deputy director of floor operations (for the Democrats) was Catlin O'Neill, granddaughter of former Speaker Tip O'Neill.
