= Arawe =

Island in Papua New Guinea

- Location in Papua New Guinea

Geography
- Coordinates: 6.1600°S 149.0150°E

Administration
- Papua New Guinea
- Province: West New Britain Province

Additional information
- Time zone: AEST (UTC+10)

Arawe is an island in Papua New Guinea. It is located on the southern coast of New Britain about 100 kilometres (62 mi) from Cape Gloucester. It is also the name given to the island's surrounding area (also known as Cape Merkus), which consists of around 40 islands.

The region is primarily inhabited by the Arawe people, who maintain trade with other people groups primarily via water. There are also multiple archaeological sites featuring Lapita structures and goods.

A small harbour known as Arawe Harbour provides an anchorage. During World War II, Japanese and Allied forces fought in the Battle of Arawe for control of the region.
