= Julian Cunningham =

United States Army general

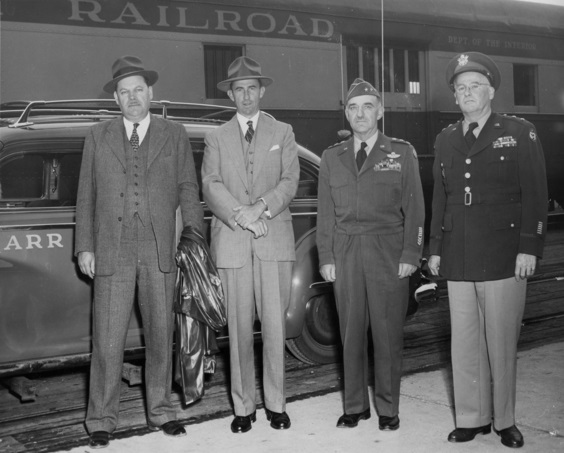
- Frank Pace, William E. Kepner and Julian W. Cunningham in Alaska, August 1951
- Born: May 1, 1893; Blairsville, Pennsylvania, U.S.
- Died: August 22, 1972 (aged 79)
- Burial place: Arlington National Cemetery
- Military career
- Allegiance: United States
- Branch: United States Army
- Service years: 1917–1952
- Rank: Major general
- Commands: 112th Cavalry Regiment
- Conflicts: World War II
- Awards: Army Distinguished Service Medal; Legion of Merit; Bronze Star Medal; Purple Heart

Julian Wallace Cunningham (May 1, 1893 – August 22, 1972) was a senior officer in the United States Army.

== Early life and education ==
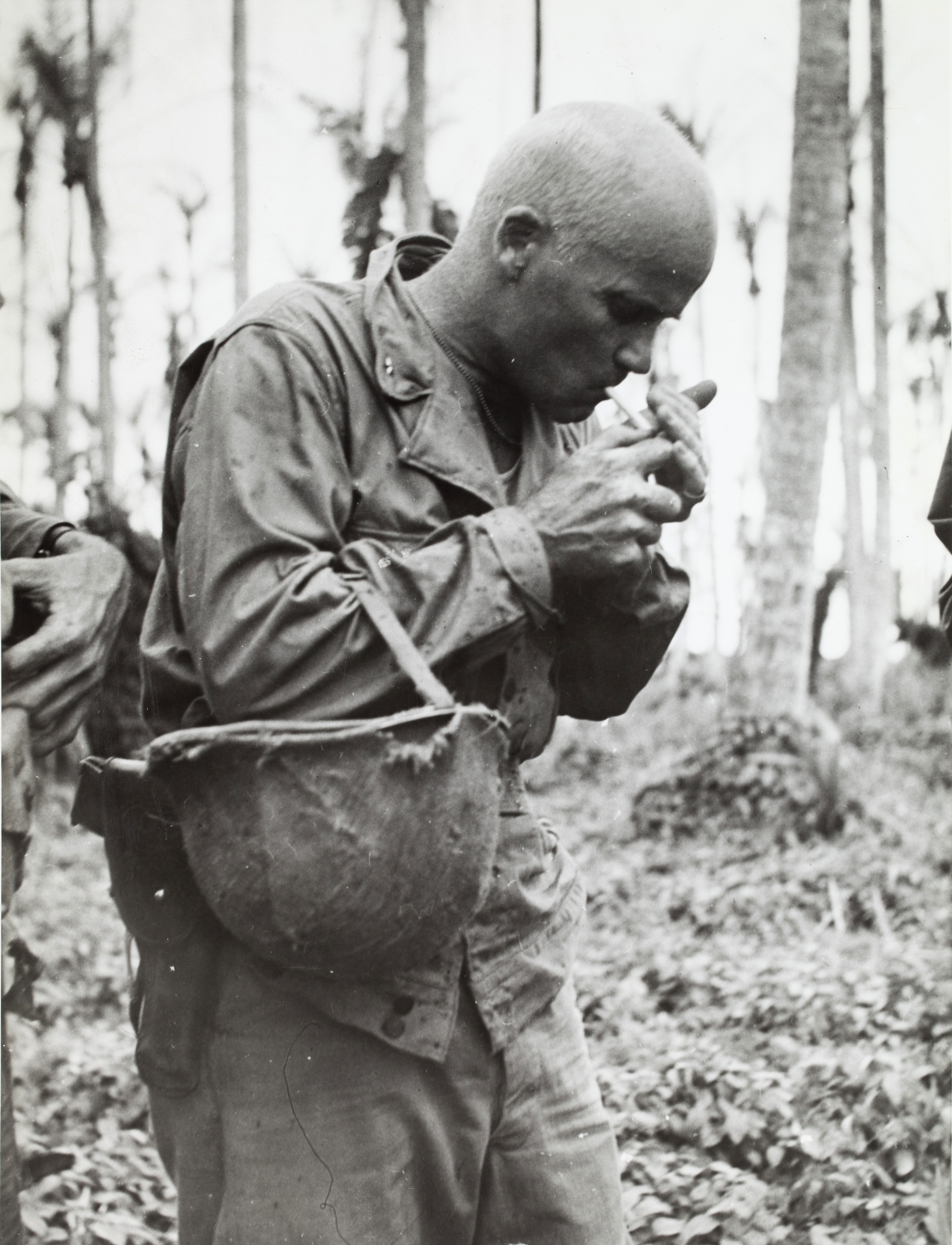
General Julian Cunningham lights a cigarette at Amulet Plantation, New Britain, 1943-44

Born on May 1, 1893, at Blairsville, Pennsylvania, Cunningham was educated at George Washington University and received a Bachelor of Arts in 1916.

== Career ==
Cunningham served in the Philippines between 1933 and 1935. During World War II, he is noted for being the Commanding Officer of the 112th Cavalry Regiment.

== Later life and death ==
Cunningham died on August 22, 1972. He and his wife Margaret are buried in Arlington National Cemetery.
