= Sheri Meyers =

American therapist and media personality

Sheri Ann Meyers
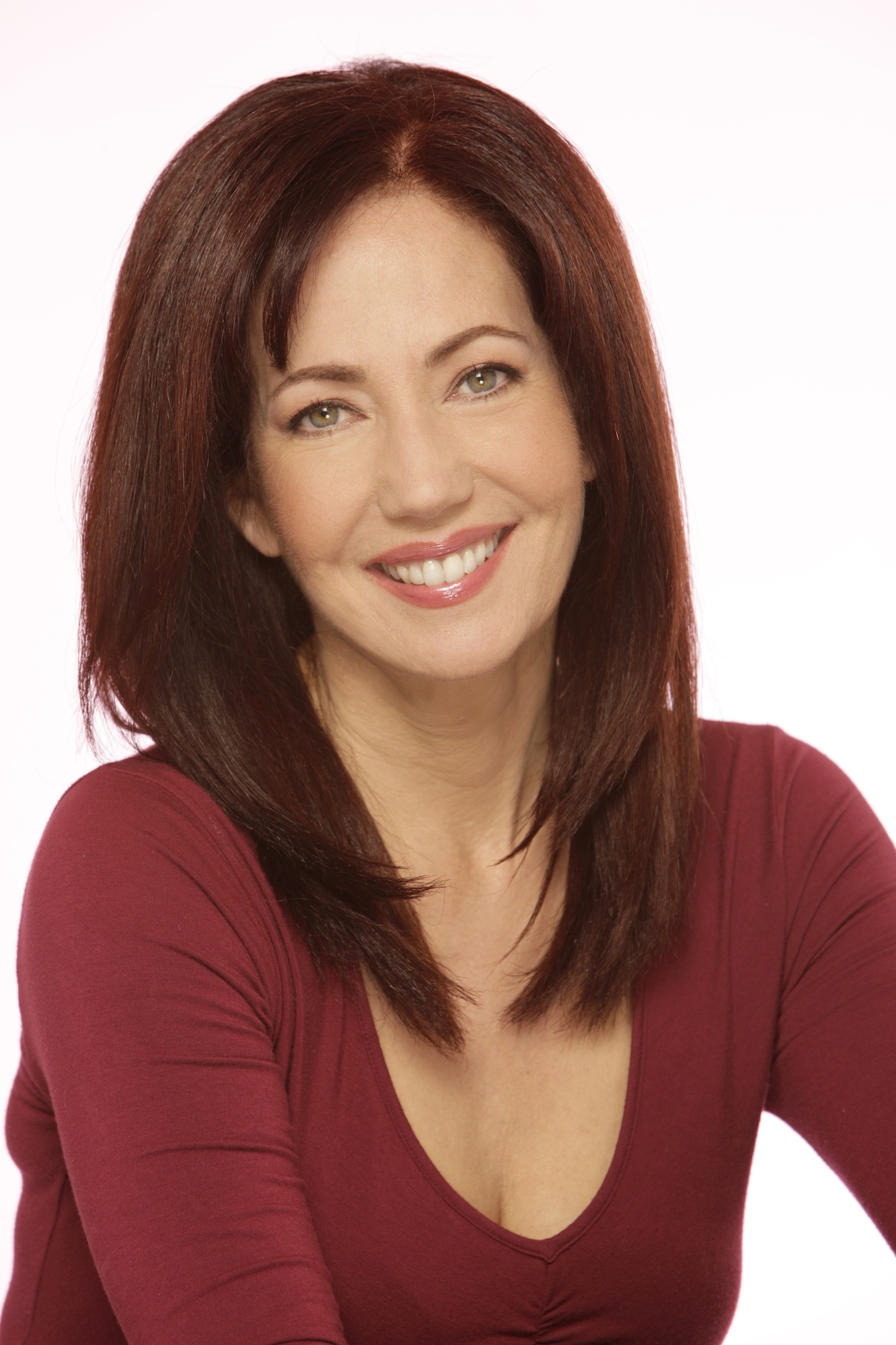
- Born: Los Angeles, California, United States
- Occupations: Marriage, family therapist, author, television and radio commentator
- Writing career
- Language: English
- Website: www.drsheri.com

Sheri Meyers, Psy.D is a marriage and family therapist, television talk show host and commentator, and most recently author. Meyers is based in Los Angeles, California. She writes about relationship and infidelity issues. Meyers has appeared on networks including CNN, ABC, NBC,CBS, and Fox, as well as various television and radio talk shows.

== Career ==
Meyers was a marriage and family therapist for around 25 years. In 1999, she created the talk show "Straight from the Heart," which aired for 11 seasons.

Meyers has written about relationships, intimacy, and infidelity for the Huffington Post since 2012. She covers topics such as emotional infidelity, strengthening relationships, and navigating breakups and reconciliations.

Meyers also writes for online magazines like Yahoo! Shine and SheKnows.com. In March 2013, she wrote a featured article and devised a test for the Katie Couric Show, about the effects of social networking and internet addiction on relationships.

== Book ==
Meyers' first book, "Chatting or Cheating: How to Detect Infidelity, Rebuild Love and Affair-Proof Your Relationship", was released on March 5, 2012. The book is published by From the Heart Media. The book discusses preventing or detecting infidelity, confronting a cheating partner, surviving betrayal, rebuilding trust, and repairing intimacy and safely loving again. She discussed the book on several television shows and networks, including The Ricki Lake Show, The Steve Harvey Show, CBS "The Couch", KTLA, and Fox Studio 11.

In the book Meyers discusses what she calls "emotional sex," which she defines as "a sexual chemistry; that you may or may not recognize; a secret attraction and feeling of intimacy that you have with another person."
