= Cape Gloucester (Papua New Guinea) =

Headland on New Britain, Papua New Guinea

Coordinates: 5.45°S 148.42°E

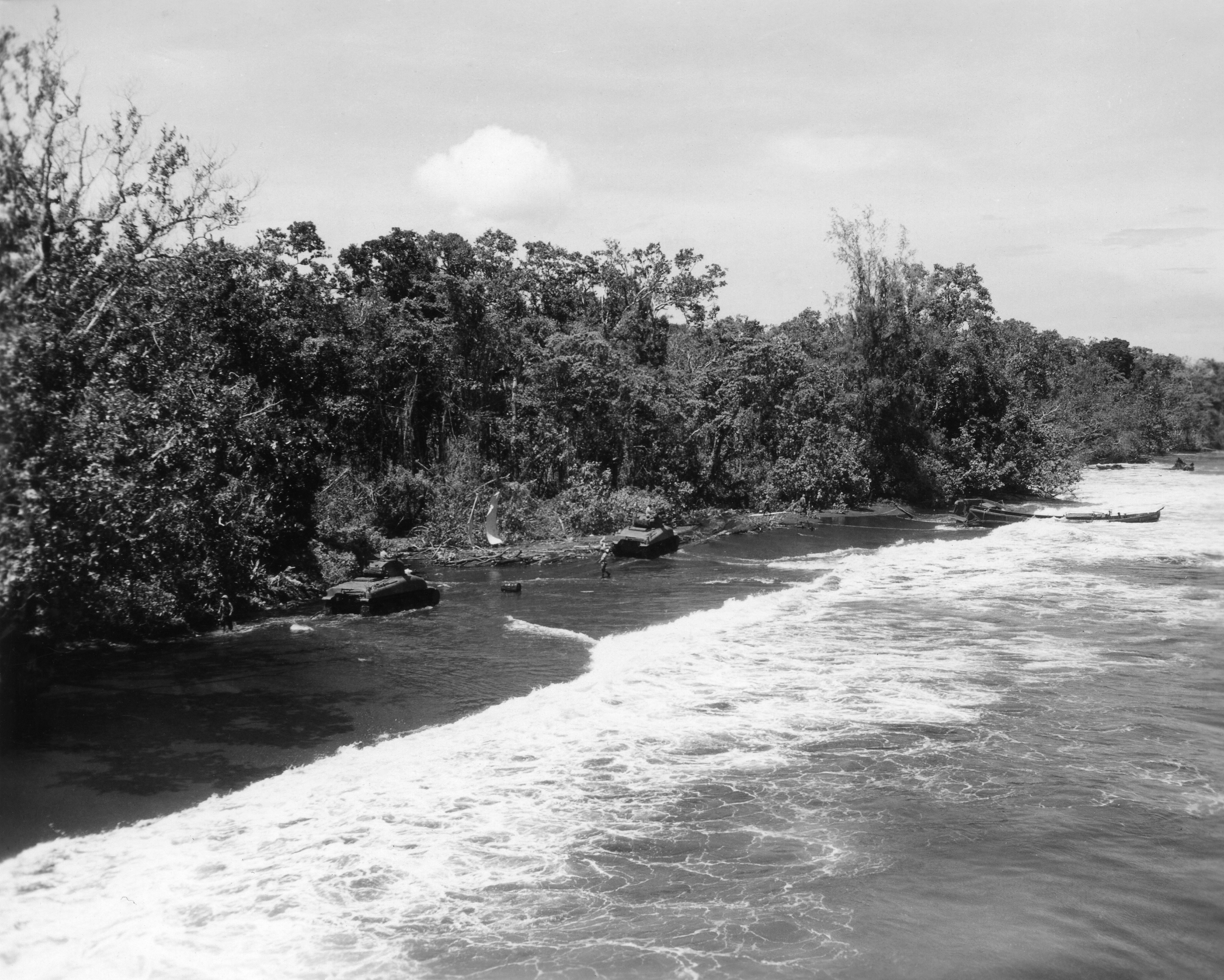
Tanks ashore of Cape Gloucester

Cape Gloucester (also known as Tuluvu) is a headland on the northern side of the far west of the island of New Britain, Papua New Guinea.

== History ==
=== World War II ===
During World War II, the Japanese captured New Britain, and had driven most of Cape Gloucester's native population out to construct two airfields. During the New Britain Campaign, American forces had decided to capture Cape Gloucester for its two airfields, to assist planned attacks on the garrison on Rabaul, an important area in New Britain. It became the site of the Battle of Cape Gloucester, part of Operation Cartwheel, in 1943. After long fighting through rain and Japanese, the United States 1st Marine Division had it declared secured. After the war, the headland was given back to the natives.
