= William Kay =

William Kay may refer to:

== Politicians ==
- William Kay (politician) (1829–1889) businessman and politician in South Australia
- William A. Kay (1864-1931), American politician
- William Frederic Kay (1876–1942), Canadian politician

== Sports ==
- William Kay (cricketer) (1893-1973), Australian cricketer
- Will Kay (born 1984), rugby player
- Bill Kay (baseball) (1878–1945), outfielder in Major League Baseball
- Bill Kay (defensive back) (born 1960), former American football player, a defensive back for the Houston Oilers.
- Bill Kay (tackle) (1925-2007), American football player, a tackle for the New York Giants.
- Billy Kay (wrestler) (born 1989), Australian professional wrestler

== Baronets ==
- Sir William Kay, 2nd Baronet (died 1850) of the Kay baronets
- Sir William Algernon Kay, 5th Baronet (1837–1914) of the Kay baronets
- Sir William Algernon Ireland Kay, 6th Baronet CMG DSO (1876–1918) of the Kay baronets

== Others ==
- William Kay (journalist), British financial and business journalist
- William Kay (priest) (1894–1980), Anglican Provost of Blackburn
- William Kay (scholar) (1820–1886), English cleric and academic
- Billie Kay (born 1989), Australian professional wrestler
- Billy Kay (actor) (born 1984), American film and television actor
- Billy Kay (writer) (born 1951), writer, broadcaster and language activist
- William Kay, namesake of Kaysville, Utah

== See also ==
- William Kaye (disambiguation)
