= Battle of St Quentin Canal =

1918 battle on the Western Front

- Part of the Hundred Days Offensive of World War I
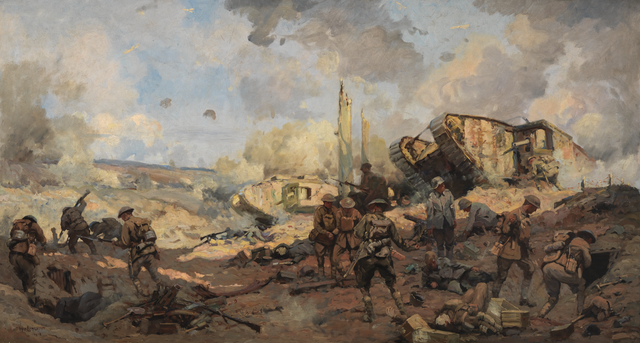
- Breaking the Hindenburg Line by William Longstaff
| Date | 29 September – 10 October 1918 |
| Location | Hindenburg Line, France 49°58′30″N 3°13′54″E |
| Result | Allied victory |
| Territorial changes | Total break of Hindenburg Line |

Belligerents
| British Empire: United Kingdom; Australia; United States | (German Empire) Germany |

Commanders and leaders
| (United Kingdom of Great Britain and Ireland) Sir Henry Rawlinson; (Australia) Sir John Monash; (United Kingdom of Great Britain and Ireland) Sir Walter Braithwaite; (United States) George Windle Read | (German Empire) Adolph von Carlowitz |

Strength
| 32 divisions: 30 British Empire; 2 American divisions | 39 divisions (Note: Bean lists the following German divisions facing the attack: 54th, 121st, 185th, 75th Reserve, 21st, 2nd Guards, 2nd, 119th, 241st, 54th, 24th, 8th and 21st Reserve divisions. Note: this list is incomplete, as it does not include the forces facing the Allies after 5 October.) |

Casualties and losses
| (United Kingdom of Great Britain and Ireland) 8,802 (partial) (United States) 13,182 (Australia) 2,577 | (German Empire) 36,000 POW |

The Battle of St Quentin Canal was a pivotal battle of World War I that began on 29 September 1918 and involved British, Australian and American forces operating as part of the British Fourth Army under the overall command of General Sir Henry Rawlinson. Further north, part of the British Third Army also supported the attack. South of the Fourth Army's 19 km (12 mi) front, the French First Army launched a coordinated attack on a 9.5 km (6 mi) front. The objective was to break through one of the most heavily defended stretches of the German Siegfriedstellung (Hindenburg Line), which in this sector used the St Quentin Canal as part of its defences. The assault achieved its objectives (though not according to the planned timetable), resulting in the first full breach of the Hindenburg Line, in the face of heavy German resistance. In concert with other attacks of the Grand Offensive along the length of the line, Allied success convinced the German high command that there was little hope of an ultimate German victory.

== Background ==
Rawlinson wanted the Australian Corps, under the command of Lieutenant General Sir John Monash, with its well-earned reputation, to spearhead the attack. Monash was unhappy, because his Australian force was by now short of manpower, and many soldiers were showing signs of strain, having been heavily engaged in fighting for several months. There had been some episodes of mutiny by troops who were feeling unfairly put upon. Monash was however very pleased when Rawlinson offered him the American II Corps (the U.S. 27th and 30th Divisions), which still remained at the disposal of the British command, since American divisions were twice the numerical strength of their British counterparts. (Note: A number of U.S. divisions had trained in the British sector with British instructors, though Pershing had always resisted having their entire training carried out by the British. The 27th and 30th Divisions were the only ones that Pershing permitted to remain with the British by this time. Both had spent their entire time since arriving in France in the British area.) U.S. Corps commander Major General George Windle Read handed command of his American force for the duration of the action to Monash. However, the American soldiers lacked battle experience. A small group of 217 Australian officers and N.C.O.s was assigned to the U.S. troops for advice and liaison. The British high command considered that German morale was suffering badly and that their capacity to resist was much weakened. Monash believed that the operation would be "more a matter of engineering and organisation than of fighting." While there had been some evidence of poor German morale from previous operations, this proved to be a dangerous assumption.

Monash was tasked with drawing up the battle plan. He would use the Americans to breach the Hindenburg Line and the Australian 3rd and 5th Divisions to follow behind and then exploit the breakthrough. Monash intended to attack the Hindenburg Line south of Vendhuile where the St Quentin Canal runs underground for some 5,500 m (6,000 yd) through the Bellicourt Tunnel (which had been converted by the Germans into an integral part of the Hindenburg Line defensive system). The tunnel was the only location where tanks could cross the canal. Where the canal runs underground, the main Hindenburg Line trench system was sited to the west of the line of the canal. Two British corps, III and IX, would be deployed in support of the main assault. To Monash's plan Rawlinson made a very significant change: IX Corps would launch an assault directly across the deep canal cutting south of the Bellicourt Tunnel. This plan originated with Lieutenant-General Sir Walter Braithwaite, commander of IX Corps. Monash felt such an assault to be doomed to failure and would never have planned for it himself, believing it to be too risky. This view was shared by many in the 46th (North Midland) Division of IX Corps, which was tasked with spearheading the assault. The Germans believed the canal cutting to be impregnable.

== Prelude ==
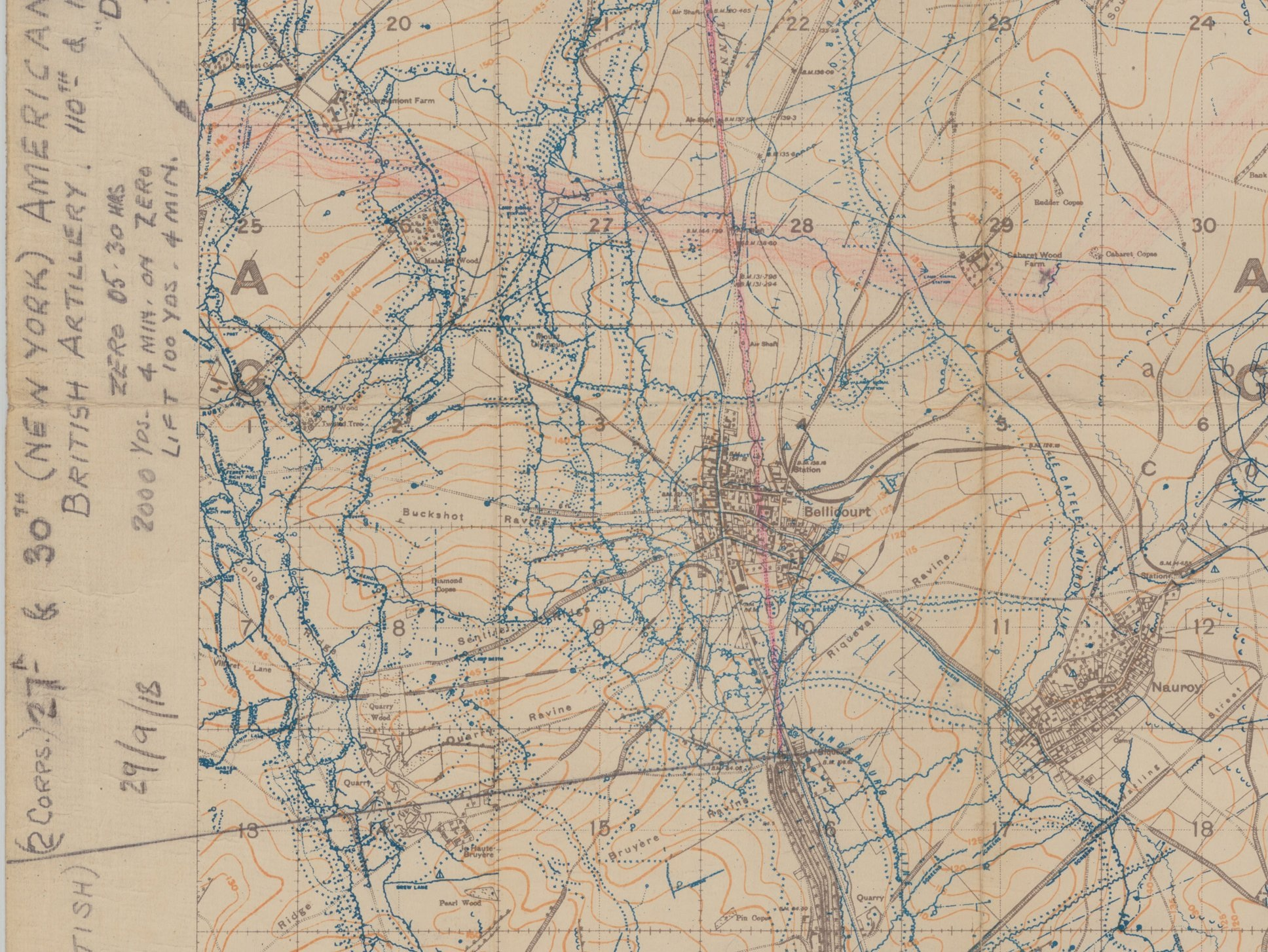
Detail of a British trench map of Bellicourt. The canal tunnel is coloured red. The Hindenburg Line runs west of the tunnel and east of the canal cutting.

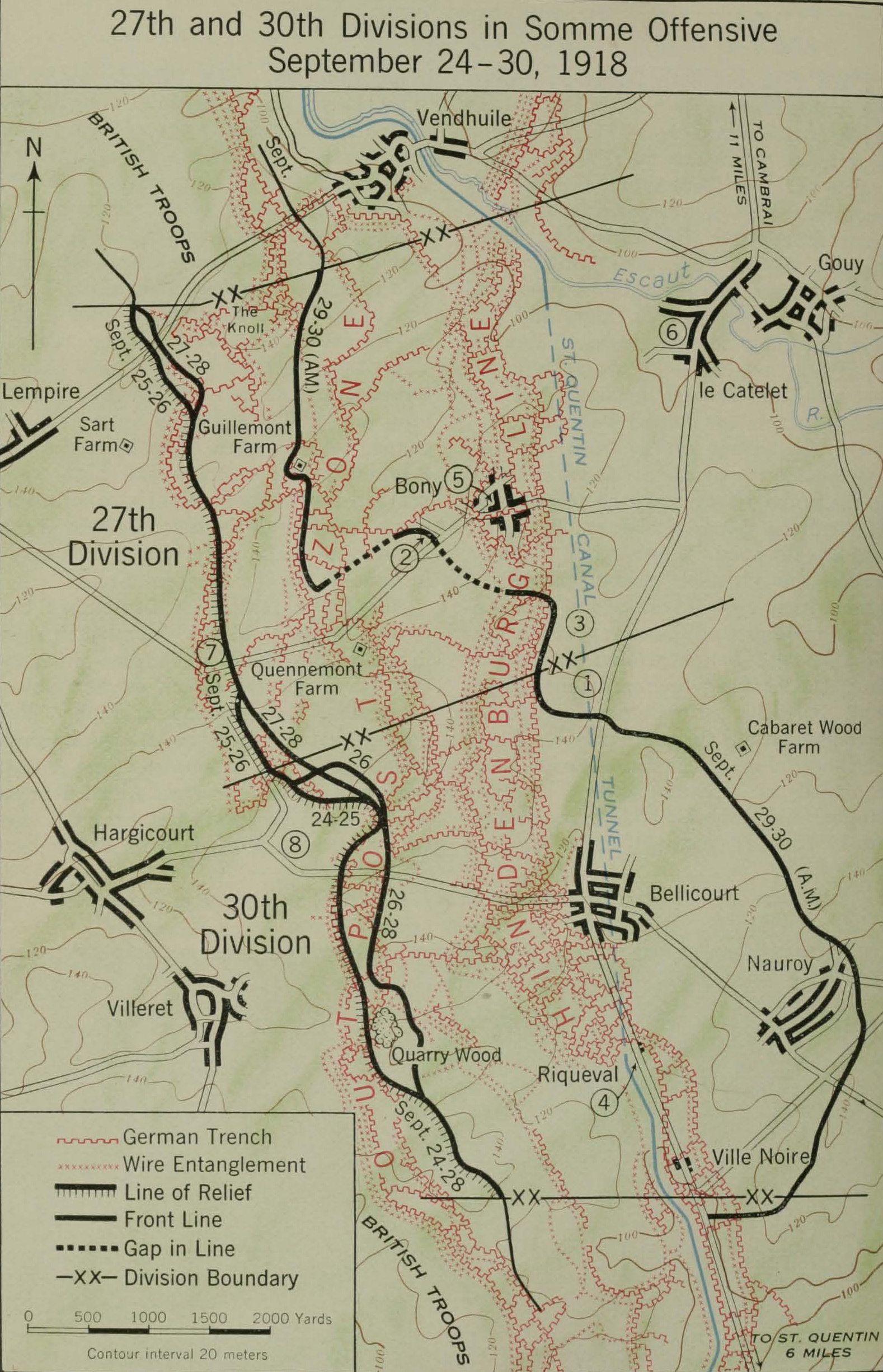
Map showing the operations of U.S. 27th and 30th Divisions affiliated to Australian Corps as part of British Fourth Army during the Battle of St Quentin Canal, 29 September 1918. The advance shown was actually made by combined American and Australian forces.

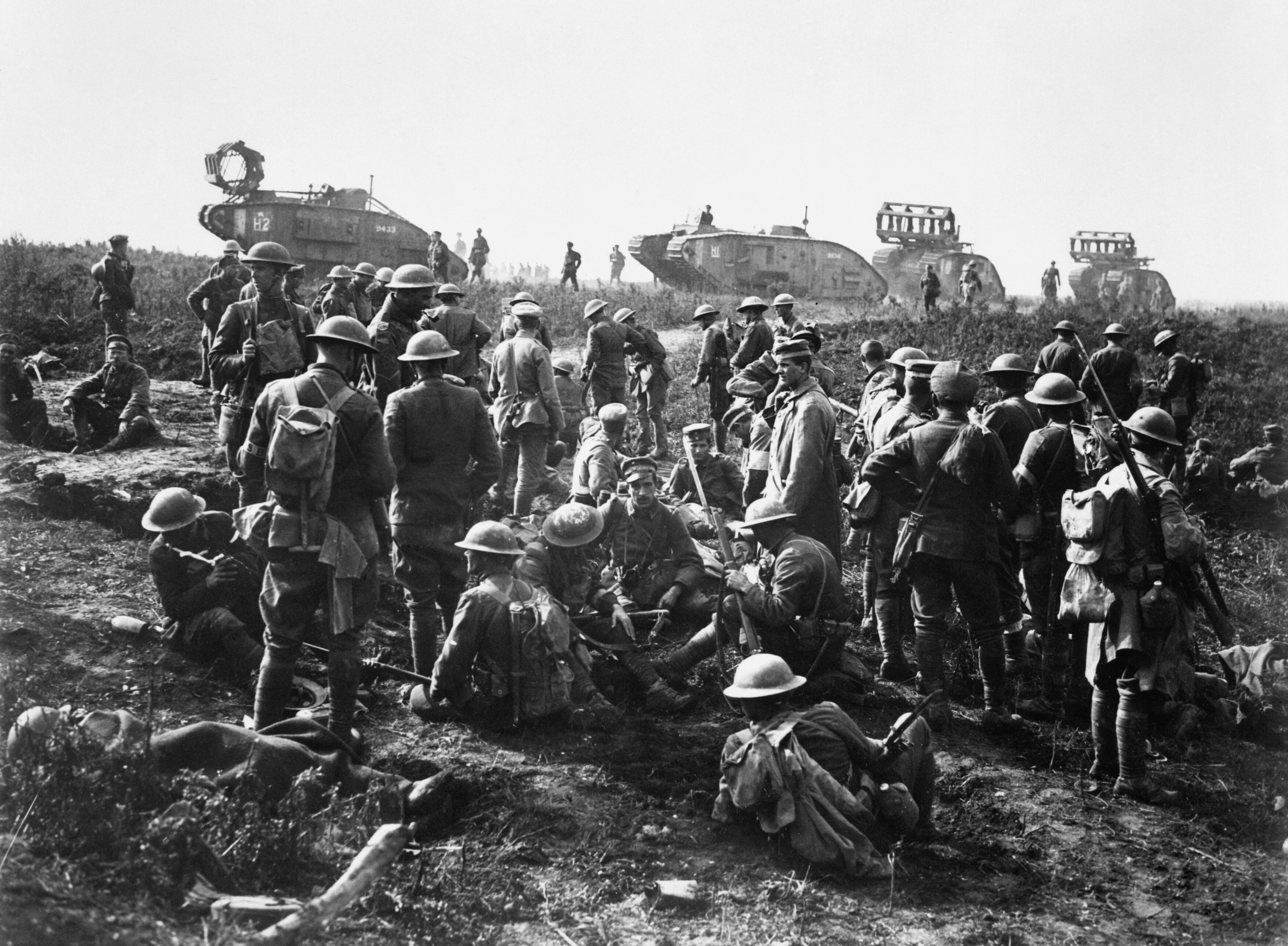
Men of the American 30th Division at rest with German prisoners following the capture of Bellicourt, 29 September 1918. In the background are British Mark V tanks (with 'cribs' for crossing trenches) of the 8th Battalion, Tank Corps, which was one of four battalions of the 5th Tank Brigade allotted to the 5th Australian Division and American Corps for the operation.

After the German spring offensive, British Empire, French, and American counterattacks during the Hundred Days Offensive brought the Allies back up against the outposts of the Hindenburg Line by the autumn of 1918, close to the village of Bellicourt, where the Battle of Épehy was fought on 18 September 1918.

=== Preliminary operation of 27 September ===
Monash's plan assumed that the Hindenburg outpost line would be in Allied hands by the date set for the start of the battle. While the Australians had already captured it in the southern part of the front (from where the American 30th Division would launch its attack), the northern section of the line was still in German hands. The American 27th Division was ordered to attack on 27 September, to finish clearing German forces from outposts in front of their line, including the strong points of The Knoll, Gillemont Farm, and Quennemont Farm. Commander in Chief Field Marshal Sir Douglas Haig initially opposed using the Americans to take the outpost line, wanting to preserve them for the main attack. He was persuaded by Rawlinson to change his mind. The British III Corps had previously failed to capture the outposts, but that failure had been attributed by Rawlinson to the tiredness of the troops. Rawlinson was convinced that the Germans were at breaking point and managed to persuade Haig that this was so. The American soldiers were inexperienced and problems were compounded by a shortage of American officers (there were only 18 officers in the 12 attacking companies whereas at the time a company would normally have roughly six officers each – the remainder were absent receiving further training).

The U.S. attack was unsuccessful. Monash asked Rawlinson for permission to delay the main attack due on 29 September, but this was refused because of the priority given to Marshal Ferdinand Foch's strategy of keeping the Germans under the relentless pressure of coordinated assaults along the front. As a result of the confusion created by the failed attack (with the corps command being unsure of where the American troops were), the battle on 29 September on the American 27th Division front had to be started without the customary (and highly effective) close artillery support. The British artillery commander argued that attempting to alter the barrage timetable at this late stage would cause problems, and the American divisional commander Major General John F. O'Ryan was also concerned about the possibility of friendly fire. (Note: The two American divisions were reliant on British guns because they did not have their own artillery.) All of the Allied commanders therefore agreed to proceed with the original artillery fire plan. The result was that the barrage would now start at the originally-intended jump-off point, some 900 m (1,000 yd) beyond the actual starting point of the infantry, leaving them very vulnerable during their initial advance. 27th Division was required to make an advance greater than any that had been asked of its highly experienced Australian allies, an advance of some 4,500 m (5,000 yd) in a single action. In an attempt to compensate for the lack of a creeping barrage Rawlinson provided additional tanks. However, the absence of a creeping barrage in the 27th Division sector was to have a very detrimental effect on the initial operations of the battle on the front opposite the tunnel.

== Main assault of 29 September ==
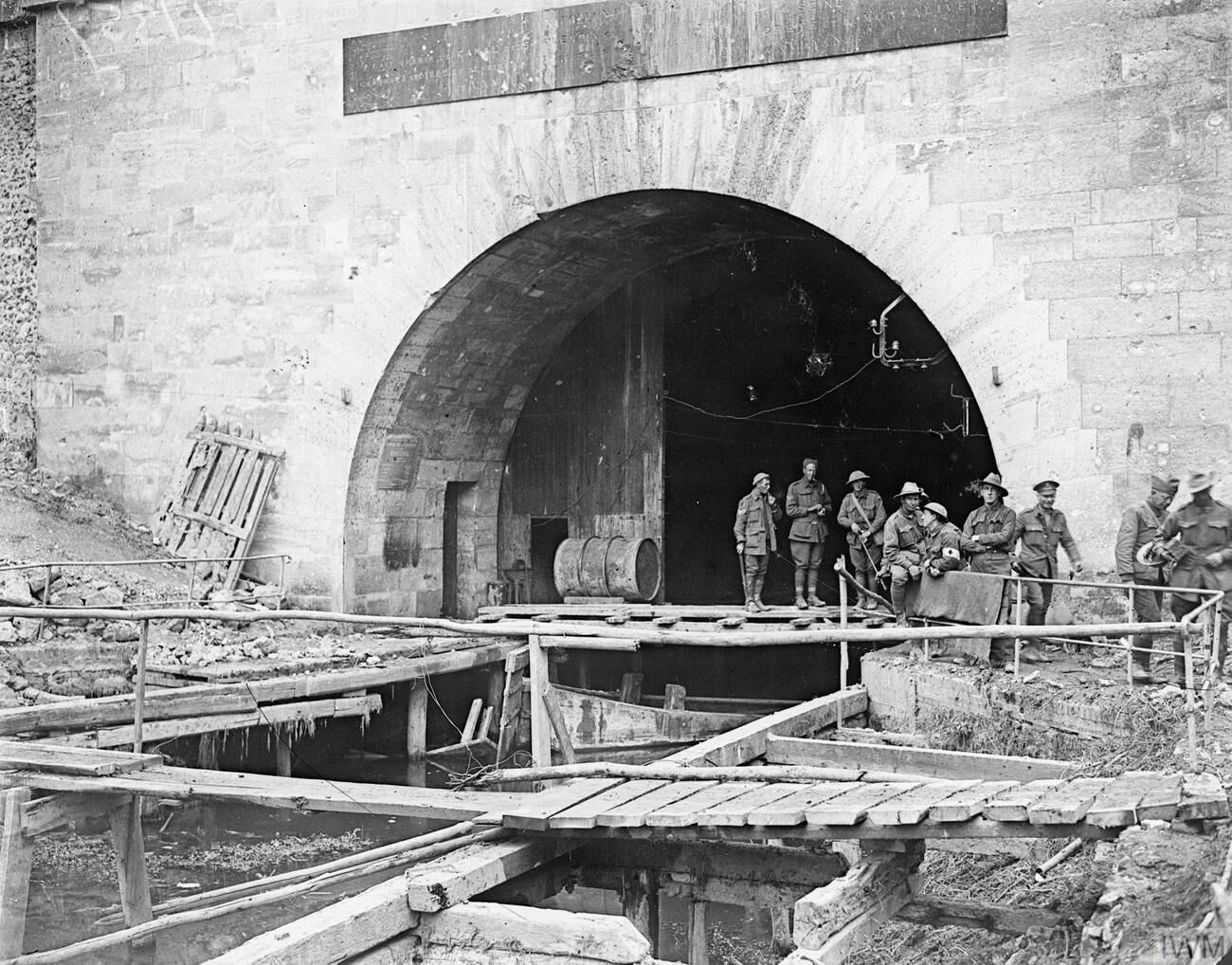
Soldiers of the 30th American Infantry Division and the 15th Australian Brigade (5th Australian Division) at the southern entrance of the Bellicourt Tunnel at Riqueval near Bellicourt. It was captured by the American 30th Division on 29 September 1918. (Photographed 4 October 1918).

The battle was preceded by the greatest British artillery bombardment of the war. Some 1,600 guns were deployed (1,044 field guns and 593 heavy guns and howitzers), firing almost 1,000,000 shells over a comparatively short period of time. Included in these were more than 30,000 mustard gas shells (the first use of a British-made version of this weapon). These were specifically targeted at headquarters and groups of batteries. Many of the high explosive shells fired had special fuses which made them very effective in destroying the German barbed wire. The British were greatly helped by the fact that they were in possession of highly detailed captured plans of the enemy defences (especially useful for the IX Corps sector). Monash's battle plan for 29 September envisaged breaking through the main Hindenburg Line defences, crossing the canal tunnel mound, breaching the fortified Le Catelet–Nauroy Line beyond that, and reaching the Beaurevoir Line (the final fortified line) beyond that as the objective on the first day. Monash had originally intended to capture the Beaurevoir Line on 29 September, but Rawlinson removed this as a first day objective, considering it overly ambitious.

=== Attack over Bellicourt Tunnel ===
On 29 September, the two American divisions attacked, followed by the two Australian divisions, with approximately 150 tanks of the 4th and 5th Tank Brigades of the British Tank Corps (including the newly trained American 301st Battalion, Tank Corps, which was equipped with British tanks) in support of the four divisions. The objective of the Americans was the Le Catelet-Nauroy Line, a defensive line east of the canal. Here the Australian 3rd Division (behind the U.S. 27th) and 5th Division (behind the U.S. 30th) were intended to "leapfrog" through the American forces and press on towards the Beaurevoir Line. Australian 2nd Division was in reserve.

On the left of the front, where the U.S. 27th Division began at a disadvantage, none of the objectives were met on the first day and the Americans suffered severe losses. The 107th Infantry Regiment suffered the worst casualties sustained in a single day by any U.S. regiment during the war. Rather than leapfrogging through the Americans, the Australian 3rd Division became involved in a desperate fight for positions that should already have been captured had Monash's plan run to timetable. Despite some individual acts of heroism the lack of progress on the left of the front had an adverse effect on the progress of the right of the front too. As the American 30th Division and then the Australian 5th Division moved forward whilst the units to their left did not, they had to contend with German fire from the side and rear as well as from ahead. An added difficulty was thick fog across the battlefield in the earlier stages of the attack which led to American troops passing by Germans without realising that they were there, with the Germans causing severe problems to the Americans following the assault wave. Fog also caused problems for infantry/tank cooperation. (Note: The fog was however helpful to IX Corps.) The 30th Division broke through the Hindenburg Line in the fog on 29 September 1918, entering Bellicourt, capturing the southern entrance of Bellicourt Tunnel and reaching the village of Nauroy, where Australian troops joined them to continue the attack.

The advancing Australians came across large groups of leaderless, disoriented Americans. Charles Bean wrote: "By 10 o'clock Monash's plan had gone to the winds.... From that hour onward ... the offensive was really directed by Australian battalion or company commanders at the front..." The 30th Division won the praise of General John J. Pershing, who wrote: "... the 30th Division did especially well. It broke through the Hindenburg Line on its entire front and took Bellicourt and part of Nauroy by noon of the 29th." There has since been considerable debate over the extent to which the American forces were successful. Monash wrote: "...in this battle they demonstrated their inexperience in war, and their ignorance of some of the elementary methods of fighting employed on the French front. For these shortcomings they paid a heavy price. Their sacrifices, nevertheless, contributed quite definitely to the partial success of the day's operations..." The objective of U.S. II Corps, the Catelet–Nauroy Line, was not captured by the Americans. During the battle, Monash was furious about the performance of the American divisions. Late on 29 September Rawlinson wrote: "The Americans appear to be in a state of hopeless confusion and will not, I fear, be able to function as a corps, so I am contemplating replacing them ... I fear their casualties have been heavy, but it is their own fault."

Meanwhile, on the right of the Bellicourt Tunnel front, the Australian 32nd Battalion under the command of Major Blair Wark established contact with the 1/4th Battalion, Leicestershire Regiment, of 46th Division, which had crossed the canal and were now present in force east of the Hindenburg Line.

By this stage in the war the Tank Corps had suffered greatly and there were fewer tanks available for the battle than had been deployed in the Battle of Amiens in August. Eight tanks were destroyed when they strayed into an old British minefield but the 29 September attack also highlighted the high vulnerability of tanks to strong German anti-tank measures. In one instance, four heavy tanks and five medium tanks were destroyed in the space of 15 minutes by German field guns at the same location. This was during the attempt to subdue severe machine gun fire coming from the Le Catelet–Nauroy Line in the vicinity of Cabaret Wood Farm (a tank fort – see map) and showed the danger posed by German field guns to tanks operating without close infantry support (because the crew had very limited visibility and often could not see a threat which those outside the tank could see). The tanks could protect the infantry but they also needed the close cooperation of the infantry to alert them to the danger of concealed field guns. In the case of this attack, the machine gun fire was so severe that the infantry were ordered to withdraw, leaving the tanks well forward of them and prey to the German field guns.

=== Attack across the canal cutting ===
The attack across the canal cutting, also known as the Battle of Bellenglise, saw IX Corps (commanded by Braithwaite), on the right of the American and Australian Divisions, launch its assault between Riqueval and Bellenglise. (Note: On the right of the IX Corps front the canal ran through the 1,200-yard (1,100 m) Le Tronquoy Tunnel, but there was no intention to launch an attack across the tunnel in the manner of the planned assault on the Bellicourt Tunnel.) The assault was spearheaded by the British 46th Division under the command of Major-General Gerald Boyd. In this sector the St Quentin Canal formed an immense, ready-made anti-tank "ditch" and the main Hindenburg Line trench system lay on the east (German) side of the canal. IX Corps was supported by tanks of the 3rd Tank Brigade, which had to cross Bellicourt Tunnel in the American 30th Division sector and then move south along the east bank of the canal. IX Corps had to cross the formidable canal cutting (which increased in depth as it approached Riqueval until its very steep banks, strongly defended by fortified machine gun positions, were over 15 m (50 ft) deep in places), and then fight its way through the Hindenburg Line trenches. The 46th Division's final objective for 29 September was a line of high ground beyond the villages of Lehaucourt and Magny-la-Fosse. The British 32nd Division, following behind, would then leapfrog the 46th Division. Following a devastating artillery bombardment (which was heaviest in this sector), and in thick fog and smoke, the 46th Division fought its way through the German trenches west of the canal and then across the waterway. The 137th (Staffordshire) Brigade spearheaded the attack.

The ferocity of the creeping artillery barrage contributed greatly to the success of the assault, keeping the Germans pinned in their dugouts. The soldiers used a variety of flotation aids devised by the Royal Engineers (including improvised floating piers and 3,000 lifebelts from cross-Channel steamers) to cross the water. Scaling ladders were used to climb the brick wall lining the canal. Some men of the 1/6th Battalion, the North Staffordshire Regiment, led by Captain A. H. Charlton, managed to seize the still-intact Riqueval Bridge over the canal before the Germans had a chance to fire their explosive charges. (Note: The bridge had not been destroyed previously by the Germans because it was a major link to the ground they held west of the canal.) The 46th Division captured the village of Bellenglise, including its great tunnel/troop shelter (which had been constructed as part of the Hindenburg Line defences). By the end of the day the 46th Division had taken 4,200 German prisoners (out of a total for the army of 5,100) and 70 guns.

The assault across the canal met all of its objectives, on schedule, at a cost of somewhat fewer than 800 casualties to the division. The great success of the day had come where many had least expected it. The 46th Division assault was considered to be one of the outstanding feats of arms of the war. Bean described the attack as an "extraordinarily difficult task" and "a wonderful achievement" in his official Australian war history. Monash wrote that it was "an astonishing success...[which] materially assisted me in the situation in which I was placed later on the same day".

Later in the day the leading brigades of the 32nd Division (including Lt Wilfred Owen of the Manchester Regiment) crossed the canal and moved forward through the 46th Division. The whole of the 32nd Division was east of the canal by nightfall. On the right of the front in IX Corps sector, the 1st Division, operating west of the canal, had the task of protecting the right flank of the 46th Division by clearing the Germans from the ground east and north-east of Pontruet. It met with fierce German resistance and heavy enfilade fire from the south. On the evening of the 29 September orders were issued for IX Corps to seize the Le Tronquoy Tunnel defences to allow the passage of the XV French Corps over the canal tunnel. The following day, the 1st Division advanced under a creeping barrage and early in the afternoon the 3rd Brigade of the division linked up on the tunnel summit with the 14th Brigade of the 32nd Division, which had fought its way forward from the German side of the canal.

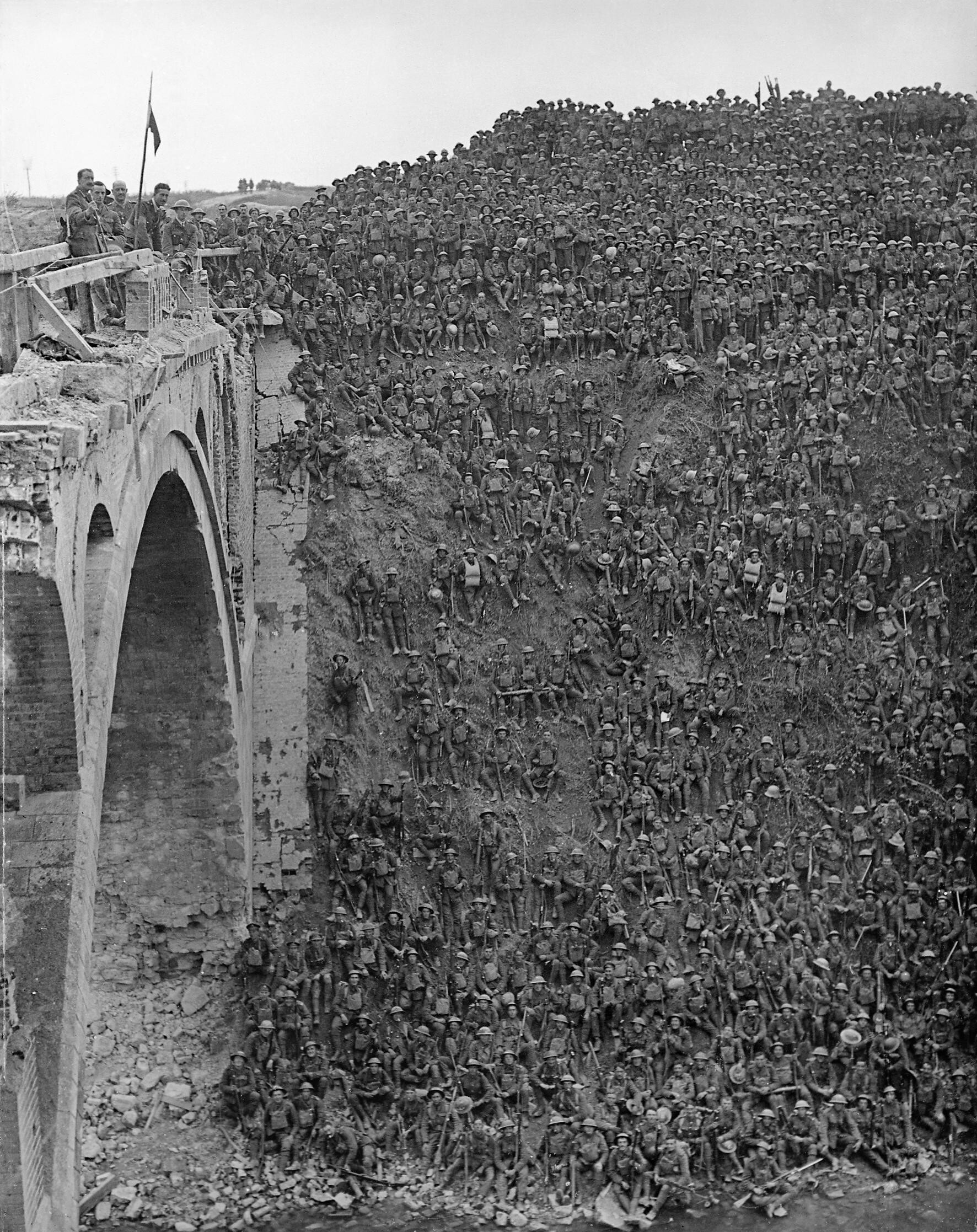
Brigadier General John Vaughan Campbell VC addressing troops of the 137th Brigade (46th Division) from the Riqueval Bridge over the St Quentin Canal on 2 October 1918

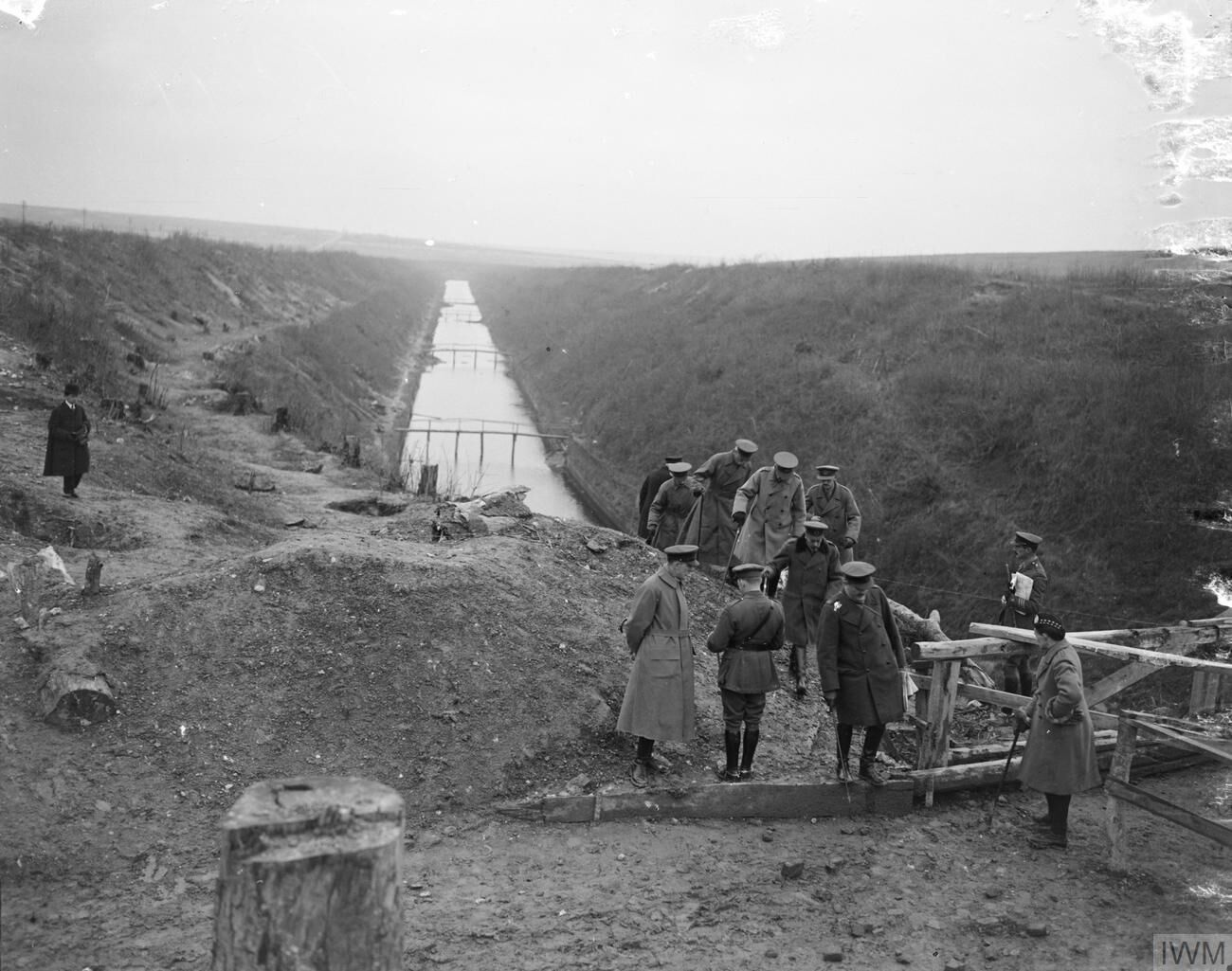
King George V at Riqueval Bridge, the scene of the exploit of the 137th Brigade when the 46th Division crossed the St Quentin Canal cutting on 29 September 1918 (photo taken 2 December).

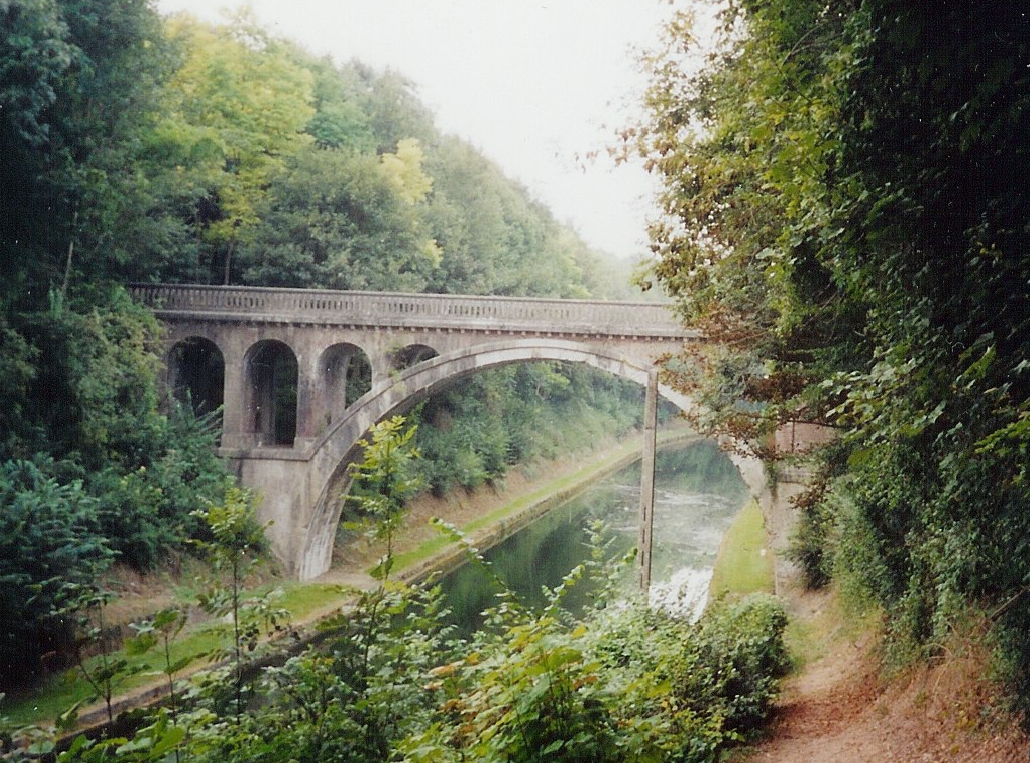
Riqueval Bridge in 2003. The canal banks are much more overgrown than when the bridge was captured during the battle.

== Aftermath ==
=== Subsequent fighting ===
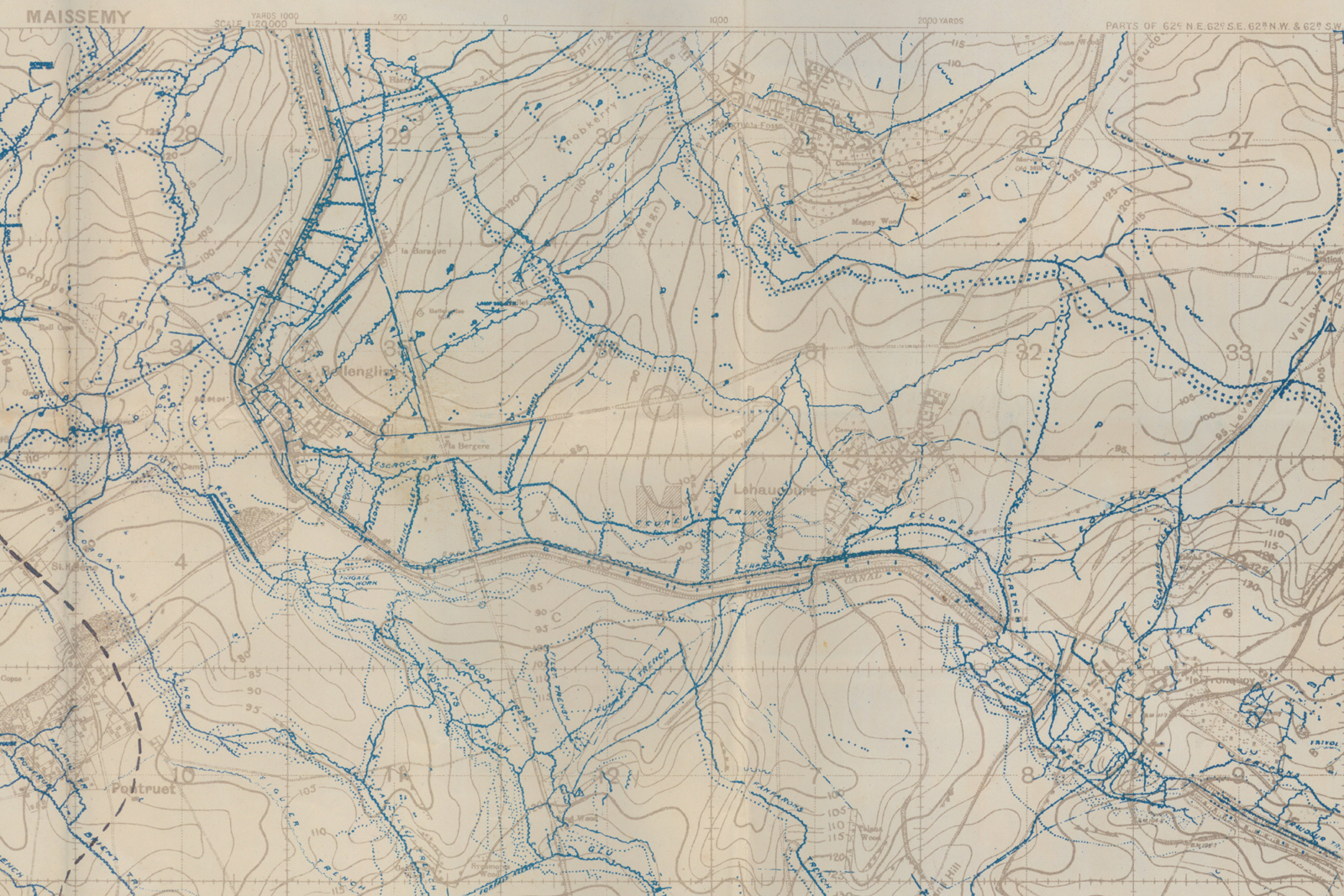
Part of British IX Corps sector, showing the St Quentin Canal and the villages of Bellenglise, Magny-la-Fosse, Lehaucourt, Le Tronquoy and Pontruet. The 32nd Division, which had crossed the canal, linked up with the 1st Division (attacking from the Allied side) above the Le Tronquoy canal tunnel.

On 2 October, the British 46th and 32nd Divisions, supported by the Australian 2nd Division, planned to capture the Beaurevoir Line (the third line of defences of the Hindenburg Line), the village of Beaurevoir and the heights overlooking the Beaurevoir Line. While the attack succeeded in widening the breach in the Beaurevoir Line, it was unable to seize the high ground further on. However, by 2 October, the attack had resulted in a 17 km breach in the Hindenburg Line.

Continuing attacks from 3 to 10 October (including those by the Australian 2nd Division capturing Montbrehain on 5 October and the British 25th Division capturing the village of Beaurevoir on 5/6 October) managed to clear the fortified villages behind the Beaurevoir Line, and capture the heights overlooking the Beaurevoir Line – resulting in a total break in the Hindenburg Line. The Australian Corps was subsequently withdrawn from the line after the fighting on 5 October, for rest and reorganisation. They would not return to the front before the Armistice on 11 November.

=== Cemeteries and memorials ===
Dead American soldiers from the battle were interred in the Somme American Cemetery near Bony, where the missing are also commemorated. The U.S. 27th and 30th Divisions (and those other units which served with the British) are commemorated on the Bellicourt Monument, which stands directly above the canal tunnel. The Australian and British dead were interred in numerous Commonwealth War Graves Commission cemeteries scattered around the area, including Bellicourt British Cemetery; Unicorn Cemetery, Vendhuile and La Baraque British Cemetery, Bellenglise (UK dead only). Australian soldiers with no known grave are commemorated on the Villers-Bretonneux Australian National Memorial and the missing British soldiers killed in the battle are commemorated on the Vis-en-Artois Memorial.
