= 32nd Battalion (Australia) =

32nd Battalion 32nd Battalion (Footscray Regiment)
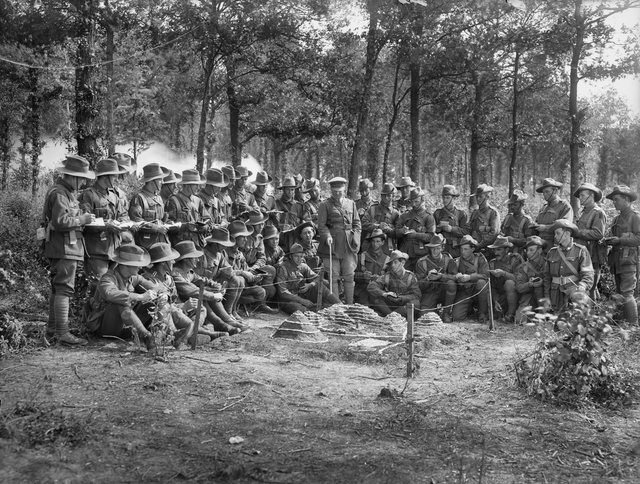
- Map reading class conducted by members of the 8th Brigade, on the Somme in July 1918
- Active: 1915–1919; 1921–1942
- Country: Australia
- Branch: Australian Army
- Type: Infantry
- Size: ~800–1,000 officers and men (Note: During the First World War, the authorised strength of an Australian infantry battalion was 1,023 men. By the start of the Second World War, it was 910 men all ranks, however, later in the war it fell to 803.)
- Garrison/HQ: 1914–19: South Australia & Western Australia; 1921–42: Victoria
- Motto: Audax Pro Patria
- Colours: White and yellow
- Engagements: First World War: Western Front; Second World War: New Britain campaign

Insignia
- Unit colour patch

The 32nd Battalion was an infantry battalion of the Australian Army. It was first raised in 1915 as part of the all-volunteer Australian Imperial Force for service during the First World War, and was initially made up of personnel from South Australia and Western Australia. The battalion served in France and Belgium in 1916–1918 before being disbanded in 1919.

It was re-raised in 1921 as the "32nd Battalion (Footscray Regiment)", a unit of the part-time Militia, and during the interwar period the battalion served as a home defence unit in Victoria. During the Second World War the battalion was merged with the 14th Battalion to become the 14th/32nd Battalion (Prahran/Footscray Regiment), serving firstly as garrison troops in Australia and New Guinea before taking part in the fighting during the New Britain campaign. In July 1945, the 14th/32nd was disbanded.

After the war, the battalion was not re-raised in its own right when the Citizens Military Force (the forerunner to the Australian Army Reserve) was formed in 1948, however, it was raised as an amalgamated unit known as the "58th/32nd Battalion (City of Essendon Regiment)". This unit remained in existence until 1960 when it was subsumed into the Royal Victoria Regiment. The battalion's honours and traditions are now maintained by the 5th/6th Battalion, Royal Victoria Regiment.

== History ==
=== First World War ===
The 32nd Battalion was raised on 9 August 1915 in Mitcham, South Australia, for overseas service with the all-volunteer Australian Imperial Force (AIF). Its first commanding officer was Lieutenant Colonel Donald Coghill. While 'A' and 'B' Companies were made up of recruits from South Australia, 'C' and 'D' Companies were formed in Perth, Western Australia, and underwent training at the Blackboy Hill Training Camp before sailing on the transport HMAT Indarra and joining the rest of the battalion in Adelaide at the end of August. Most of the battalion's recruits had previously worked as miners or farmers. After completing basic training, the battalion left Australia in November aboard the transport HMAT Geelong, bound for Egypt. It arrived amidst the aftermath of the failed Gallipoli campaign, which saw a reorganisation and expansion of the AIF in preparation for its dispatch to France and Belgium to take part in the fighting against the Germans along the Western Front.

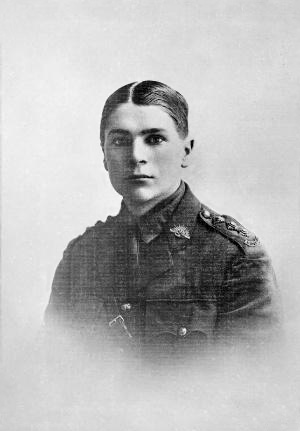
Captain Blair Wark c. 1916, who received the Victoria Cross for his leadership and bravery while leading the battalion in late 1918

In Egypt, the battalion became part of the newly formed 8th Brigade, which was attached to the 5th Division. After a further period of training, the battalion was shipped to France in June 1916, to join the fighting on the Western Front. The following month, after spending a short period in the Armentières sector, the battalion was committed to the front for the first time on 16 July 1916. Three days after taking up position in the trenches the 32nd took part in the fighting around Fromelles, being committed as part of the 8th Brigade's initial assault on the extreme left of the Australian front that was focused around a position known as the "Sugarloaf". During that fighting it suffered 718 casualties—a third of the battalion's total casualties for the entire war—which equalled roughly 90 percent of its effective strength. As a result of these losses, the 32nd Battalion was used mainly in a support role throughout the remainder of 1916, during which time, while they were not committed to any attacks in an assault role, they continued to suffer further casualties through the attrition of trench warfare.

After spending a bitter winter undertaking defensive duties on the Somme, during early 1917 the battalion took part in the operations in pursuit of the German forces as they withdrew towards the Hindenburg Line, but found itself in a flank protection role during the Second Battle of Bullecourt in May. On 26 September 1917, the battalion was heavily committed to the fighting around Polygon Wood near Ypres in Belgium during the Battle of Passchendaele; again they were employed in a support role, as the 8th Brigade's assault was led by the 29th and 31st Battalions. Following the assault, the brigade adopted a defensive posture, supporting further efforts around Zillebeke and Anzac Ridge.

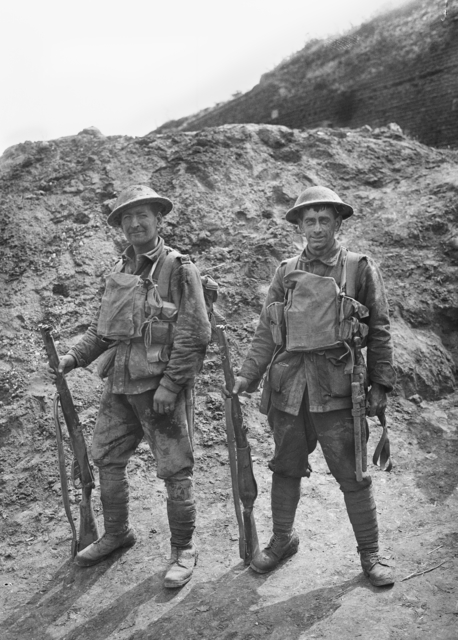
July 1918. Two members of the Australian 5th Division, including (right) Pte John Wallace Anderton, 32nd Battalion.

For the remainder of 1917 and the first half of 1918 the 5th Division mainly undertook a reserve role and as a result the 32nd Battalion had little involvement during the German spring offensive; after the winter of 1917–18, the battalion had re-entered the trenches in the Messines sector, occupying positions near Warneton in January 1918, remaining there until March. In April, the 8th Brigade had been moved to the Somme, taking up defensive positions around the canal between Corbie and Vaux. After the German advance stalled the 32nd Battalion was involved in a series of minor advances along the Bray–Corbie Road throughout July, taking part in operations around Morlancourt and the Morcourt Valley as the Allies sought to regain the initiative. Later, the Allies launched their own offensive around Amiens beginning on 8 August 1918. During this offensive the 32nd Battalion took part in operations in the Peronne area throughout August and September as the Allies sought to breach the Hindenburg Line, fighting its final engagement of the war between 29 September and 1 October 1918 as part of a joint Australian and American attack along the St Quentin Canal.

After this, the Australian Corps was removed from the line for rest and training in preparation for further operations. In order to make up for the losses the Australians had suffered during the previous months, a number of Australian battalions were disbanded at this time to provide reinforcements to those that remained. The 32nd Battalion received a large number of reinforcements from the all-Victorian 29th Battalion, which was subsequently disbanded. It was still out of the line when the Armistice was declared on 11 November 1918. During the battalion's final series of battles, the battalion was led by Major Blair Wark, who was later awarded the Victoria Cross for his leadership and bravery.

Throughout the conflict the battalion suffered 2,079 casualties of which 613 were killed. In March 1919, after most of its personnel had been repatriated to Australia, the battalion merged with the 30th Battalion before subsequently being disbanded. Members of the battalion received the following decorations: one Victoria Cross, one Distinguished Service Order (DSO), three Officers of the Order of the British Empire (OBEs), one Member of the Order of the British Empire (MBEs), 27 Military Crosses (MCs) with two Bars, 16 Distinguished Conduct Medals (DCMs); 66 Military Medals with four Bars; seven Meritorious Service Medals; 26 Mentions in Despatches (MIDs) and 10 foreign awards.

=== Inter war years ===
In 1921, when the part-time Citizens Force (later known as the Militia) was re-organised to perpetuate the numerical designations of the wartime AIF battalions, the 32nd Battalion was re-formed in Melbourne, Victoria, through an amalgamation of the 5th Battalion, 8th Infantry Regiment with part of the 2nd Battalion, 32nd Infantry Regiment, and part of the 29th (Port Philip) Light Horse Regiment. The battalion drew most of its personnel from Footscray and several other south-west and western suburbs of Melbourne and in 1927, when territorial designations were adopted, the unit came to be known as the 32nd Battalion (Footscray Regiment). The same year, the battalion motto, Audax Pro Patria, was approved and it formed an alliance with the Leicestershire Regiment. During this time, it was part of the 2nd Brigade, within the 3rd Military District. Initially the battalion's manpower was maintained through the compulsory training scheme, but this was suspended in 1929, following the election of the Scullin Labor government, and after this the force was maintained on a volunteer-only basis.

=== Second World War ===
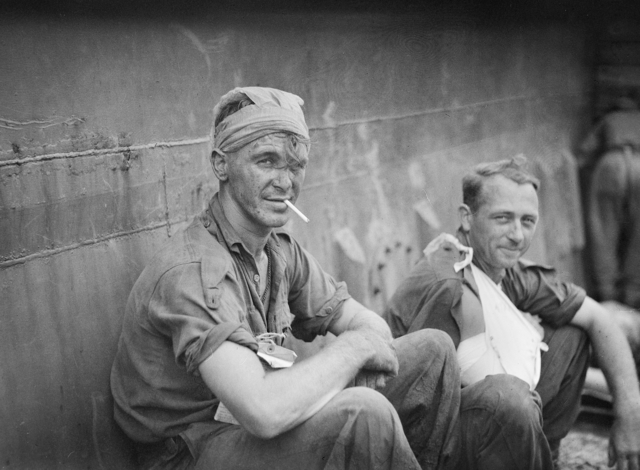
14th/32nd Battalion wounded await evacuation from the battle zone, March 1945

Following Japan's entry into the Second World War in December 1941, the battalion was called up for defensive duties. Attached to the 2nd Brigade, the battalion provided garrison troops to vital installations around Melbourne until August 1942 when it was transferred to Western Australia, being attached to the 6th Brigade, which was based around Geraldton. In September 1942, as part of an Army-wide reduction that came about because of over-mobilisation, the battalion was amalgamated with the 14th Battalion to become the 14th/32nd Battalion (Prahran/Footscray Regiment).

In early 1943, the 14th/32nd Battalion carried out amphibious warfare training in Queensland before being deployed to the Buna–Gona area in New Guinea in July. The battalion would remain in mainland New Guinea and New Britain for the next two years, under the command of Lieutenant Colonel William Caldwell. The strategy employed by the Australians during the New Britain campaign was one of containment against the much larger Japanese forces in the area. On 18 March 1945, the battalion took part in its only major battle of the war when it launched an assault on Bacon Hill and captured it. In April 1945, the 14th/32nd Battalion was withdrawn to Australia in preparation for involvement in future operations but, in July, the decision was made to disband the unit as the end of the war became apparent. During the course of the conflict the battalion suffered 77 casualties, of which 31 were killed in action or died of wounds or other causes. Members of the battalion received the following decorations for their service: one DSO, one OBE, two MCs, one British Empire Medal, one DCM, one MM and seven MIDs.

=== Post Second World War ===
In 1948, when Australia's part-time military force was re-raised under the guise of the Citizens Military Force, the battalion was re-raised albeit as an amalgamated unit. It was linked with the 58th Battalion to become the 58th/32nd Battalion and was known variously as the Melbourne Rifles, the West Melbourne Regiment and the City of Essendon Regiment. The Australian Army was reorganised around pentropic divisions in 1960. As a result of this reorganisation the CMF was greatly reduced, as 14 infantry battalions were disbanded altogether, while the 17 that remained gave up their old regional regimental ties and were reformed as part of the six newly raised State-based regiments. As a result of this, the 58th/32nd was absorbed by the pentropic 1st Battalion, Royal Victoria Regiment, forming 'E' Company, which was also known as "The Footscray Company". The battalion received two battle honours for its service during the Second World War in 1961; at the same time it was also entrusted with the honours bestowed upon the 2/32nd Battalion, which was a separate battalion formed within the Second Australian Imperial Force. After the abolition of pentropic divisions in 1965, the unit's honours and traditions became bound up in the 5th/6th Battalion, Royal Victoria Regiment, a unit which remains in existence today. The 32nd Battalion's colours were laid up at St John's Anglican Church in Footscray in August 1970.

== Battle honours ==
The 32nd Battalion was awarded the following battle honours:

- First World War: Somme 1916 & 18, Bapaume 1917, Bullecourt, Ypres 1917, Menin Road, Polygon Wood, Poelcappelle, Passchendaele, Ancre 1918, Amiens, Albert 1918, Mont St Quentin, Hindenburg Line, St Quentin Canal, France and Flanders 1916–18, Egypt 1915–16,
- Second World War: South-West Pacific 1942–1945, Waitavolo.

== Commanding officers ==
The following officers commanded the 32nd Battalion during the First World War:

- Lieutenant Colonel Donald Coghill (1915–16);
- Lieutenant Colonel Robert Beardsmore (1916–17);
- Lieutenant Colonel Charles Davies (1917–18)
- Lieutenant Colonel John McArthur (1918).

== Notes ==
Footnotes

Citations
