= Blair Wark =

Australian Victoria Cross recipient

Blair Anderson Wark VC, DSO
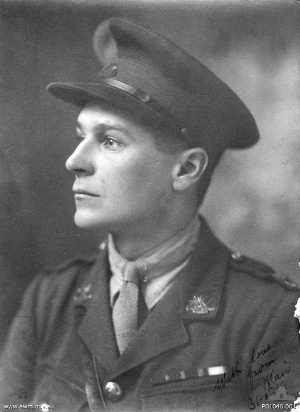
- Blair Wark c. 1919
- Born: 27 July 1894; Bathurst, New South Wales
- Died: 13 June 1941 (aged 46); Puckapunyal, Victoria
- Military career
- Allegiance: Australia
- Branch: Citizen Military Forces (1913–15, 1940–41); Australian Imperial Force (1915–19)
- Service years: 1912–1919; 1940–1941
- Rank: Lieutenant colonel
- Commands: 32nd Battalion; 1st Battalion
- Conflicts: First World War; Western Front; Battle of Fromelles; Battle of Passchendaele; Battle of Polygon Wood; Battle of Amiens; Battle of St. Quentin Canal; Second World War
- Awards: Victoria Cross; Distinguished Service Order; Mentioned in Despatches

Blair Anderson Wark, VC, DSO (27 July 1894 – 13 June 1941) was an Australian soldier, quantity surveyor, and a recipient of the Victoria Cross, the highest decoration for gallantry "in the face of the enemy" that can be awarded to members of the British and other Commonwealth armed forces. A member of the Citizen Military Forces from 1912, Wark enlisted in the Australian Imperial Force on 5 August 1915 for service in the First World War. After initially being employed in the defence of the Suez Canal, his battalion was shipped to the Western Front; it was here that Wark was twice decorated for his bravery and leadership. Having received the Distinguished Service Order in 1917 for his actions at the Battle of Polygon Wood, Wark was awarded the Victoria Cross in 1918 for his leadership and gallantry when in temporary command of his battalion over a three-day period, while conducting operations against the Hindenburg Line.

Returning to Australia after the war, Wark resumed work as a quantity surveyor and established his own business. He became a respected member of Australian society, holding positions and directorships in several companies and charities until 1940, when he re-enlisted in the Citizen Military Forces for service in the Second World War. Wark was promoted to lieutenant colonel and assumed command of the 1st Battalion (City of Sydney's Own Regiment), but died suddenly at Puckapunyal Camp, Victoria, of coronary heart disease, aged 46.

== Early life ==
Wark was born in Bathurst, New South Wales, on 27 July 1894, the fourth child of Alexander Wark, a gas engineer from Scotland, and his native-born wife Blanche Adelaide Maria (née Forde). He was educated at Fairleigh Grammar School, Bathurst, and St. Leonard's Superior Public School before attending Sydney Technical College, where he studied quantity surveying.

For twelve months prior to July 1912, Wark was a senior cadet in the Australian Army Cadets, rising to the rank of sergeant within his unit. Concurrently he worked as a quantity surveyor before enlisting in the 18th North Sydney Infantry, Citizen Military Forces. Promoted to corporal in early 1913, he received a commission as a second lieutenant on 16 August, and for the next year was assigned to full-time defence duties in the port of Sydney.

== First World War ==
=== Enlistment, August 1915, to Western Front, September 1918 ===
On 5 August 1915, Wark enlisted in the Australian Imperial Force, and was posted as a lieutenant to C Company of the newly raised 30th Battalion. He proceeded to the Sydney suburb of Liverpool, where he attended an infantry school before training at the Royal Military College, Duntroon. On 9 November, the 30th Battalion embarked for Egypt aboard the troopship HMAT A72 Beltana. Upon arrival in December, the battalion was tasked with the defence of the Suez Canal where, on 20 February 1916, Wark was promoted to captain.

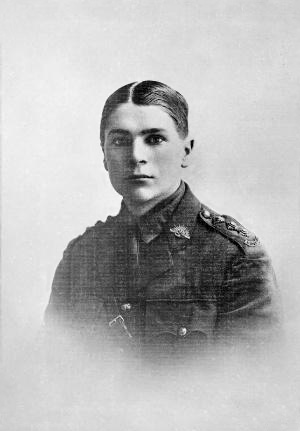
Captain Blair Wark c. 1916

In June 1916, the battalion departed from Alexandria to join the British Expeditionary Force in France for service on the Western Front; they arrived at Marseille on 23 June. The 30th Battalion's first major action began with the outbreak of the Battle of Fromelles on 19 July 1916. The unit was originally designated with providing carrying parties for supplies and ammunition during the battle, but was subsequently pulled into the fighting. Wark commanded a company during the action, until being evacuated to the 7th Stationary Hospital with a gunshot wound to his leg. He was transferred to the 3rd London General Hospital in England three days later, and moved again to the 5th Australian Auxiliary Hospital, Digswell House, Welwyn, Hertfordshire, on 7 August. Recovered by September, Wark was discharged and granted leave before returning to France and the 30th Battalion later that month.

On 9 October 1916, Wark was attached to the 32nd Battalion, a position that became permanent on 18 November. The 32nd Battalion saw no major offensive action for the remainder of the year, and on 2 January 1917, Wark gained admission to the Army Infantry School. By February he was back with the 32nd Battalion, and took part in actions at Sunray Trench during March. For these, and further actions at Fromelles, Wark was recommended for the Distinguished Service Order, but the award was never made. He was promoted to major on 27 April, and in June was granted six days of leave to Paris.

In late September and early October, Wark commanded a company in the Ypres sector of Belgium during the Battle of Polygon Wood. On 29 September—the first day of the battle—Wark's men successfully repelled the leading waves of a German counter-attack and, with artillery support, drove off the remainder. Over the following three days, his constant patrolling and personal reconnaissance of the German positions enabled him to ascertain when they were massing for further counter-attacks; on one occasion he dispersed the assembling German troops with rifle fire and grenades. For his actions during the battle, Wark was awarded the Distinguished Service Order, the details of which were published in a supplement to The London Gazette on 3 June 1918.

Granted sixteen days leave to the United Kingdom from 3 November, Wark was selected for a senior officers' course at Aldershot, England, in January 1918. On graduation he rejoined the 32nd Battalion in March as its second-in-command, and was mentioned in the despatches of Field Marshal Sir Douglas Haig on 7 April. Throughout June and July, Wark temporarily commanded the 32nd Battalion, which had played little part in the German spring offensive. The battalion took part in the Battle of Amiens on 8 August, and continued to harry retreating German forces for the rest of the month and into early September.

=== Victoria Cross, September 1918, to repatriation, September 1919 ===
From 29 September to 1 October 1918, Wark assumed temporary command of the 32nd Battalion, leading the unit in the 5th Division's attack against the Hindenburg Line at Bellicourt (part of the Battle of St Quentin Canal), and the subsequent advance through Nauroy, Etricourt, Magny La Fosse and Joncourt. This series of battles became the 32nd Battalion's final actions for the war, and it was during this period that Wark earned his Victoria Cross.

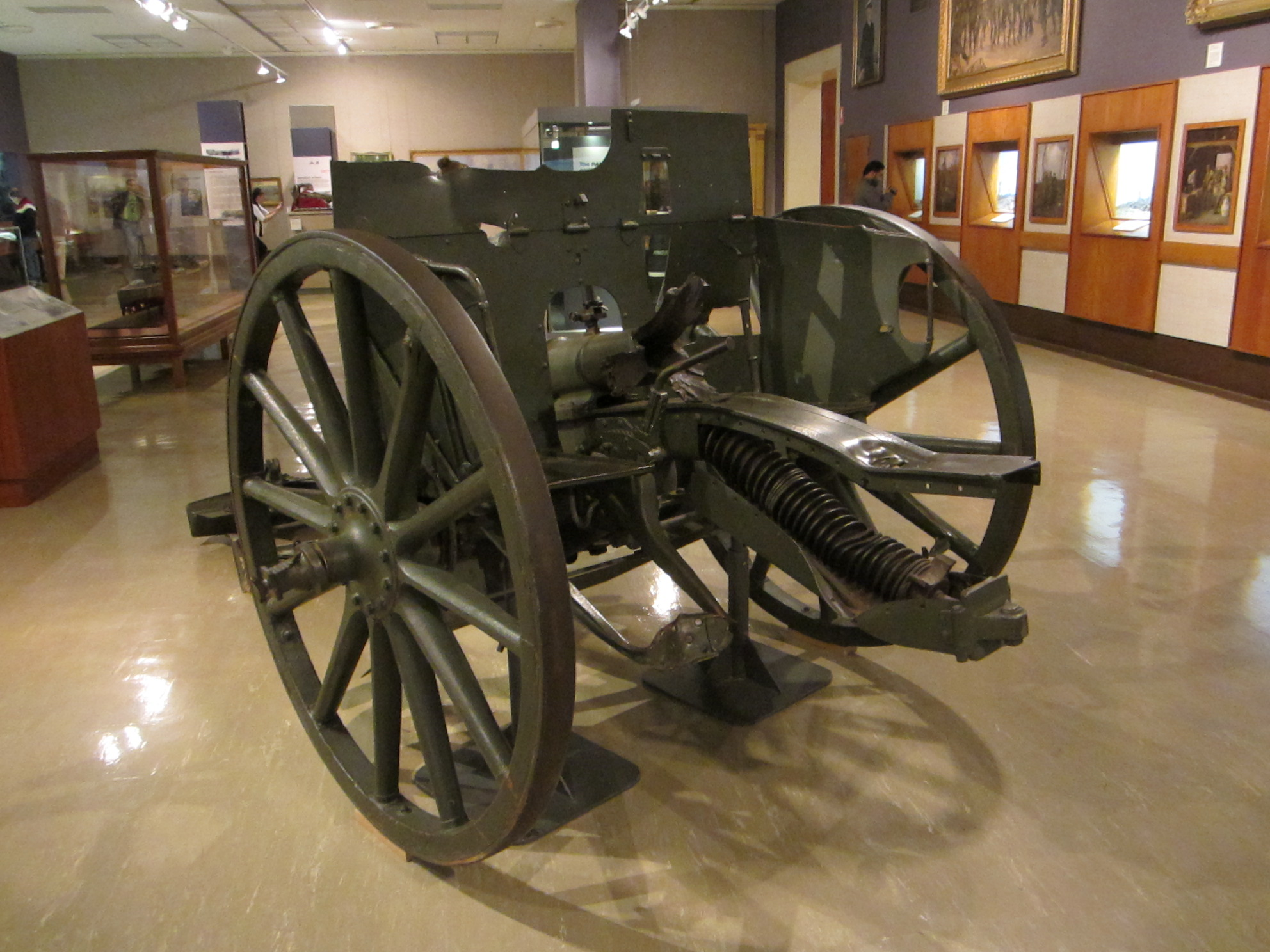
One of the 77 mm guns captured by Wark on display at the Australian War Memorial in 2012

The 32nd Battalion was to commence its attack at Bellicourt at 09:00 on 29 September, and move south through the village. Due to mist and smoke from a preceding artillery barrage, visibility was poor. When the advance was held up by two German machine guns, Wark ordered a tank to neutralise them. On reaching the southern end of St Quentin Canal tunnel, Wark came across two hundred troops of the American 117th Infantry Regiment who appeared to be leaderless, and attached them to his own command. A short time later, with visibility still poor, he appropriated armoured reinforcements and began an advance on the village of Nauroy. As the fog began to lift, Wark organised his troops for an attack on the village from a southerly direction. By 11:30, the battalion had taken the village, along with forty Germans as prisoners of war.

Shortly afterwards, Wark observed a battery of German 77 mm guns firing on his rear companies, causing heavy casualties. Collecting a party of his men, he rushed the battery and succeeded in capturing four guns in conjunction with ten crewmen. With only two men, he pushed forward and surprised fifty Germans near Magny-la-Fosse who subsequently surrendered. At 15:00, he halted his battalion near Joncourt, and sent out patrols which found the town still occupied by enemy forces. The 32nd Battalion responded by withdrawing slightly and strengthening its line. At 17:30, the Germans launched a counter-attack that was repulsed with the assistance of the 31st Battalion, together with some men from the 46th (North Midland) Division.

At 07:00 the next day, the 32nd Battalion attacked once more, advancing 1,500 metres (1,600 yd) to a point just north of Etricourt. Under heavy shelling and machine gun fire, they established a line between Joncourt and Etricourt. On 1 October, at 06:00, with a company attached from the 30th Battalion, the 32nd Battalion launched an attack that cut through Joncourt. Leading from the front, Wark dashed forward and silenced machine guns that were causing heavy casualties; this enabled the 5th Division to complete its task of forcing through to the Beaurevoir Line.

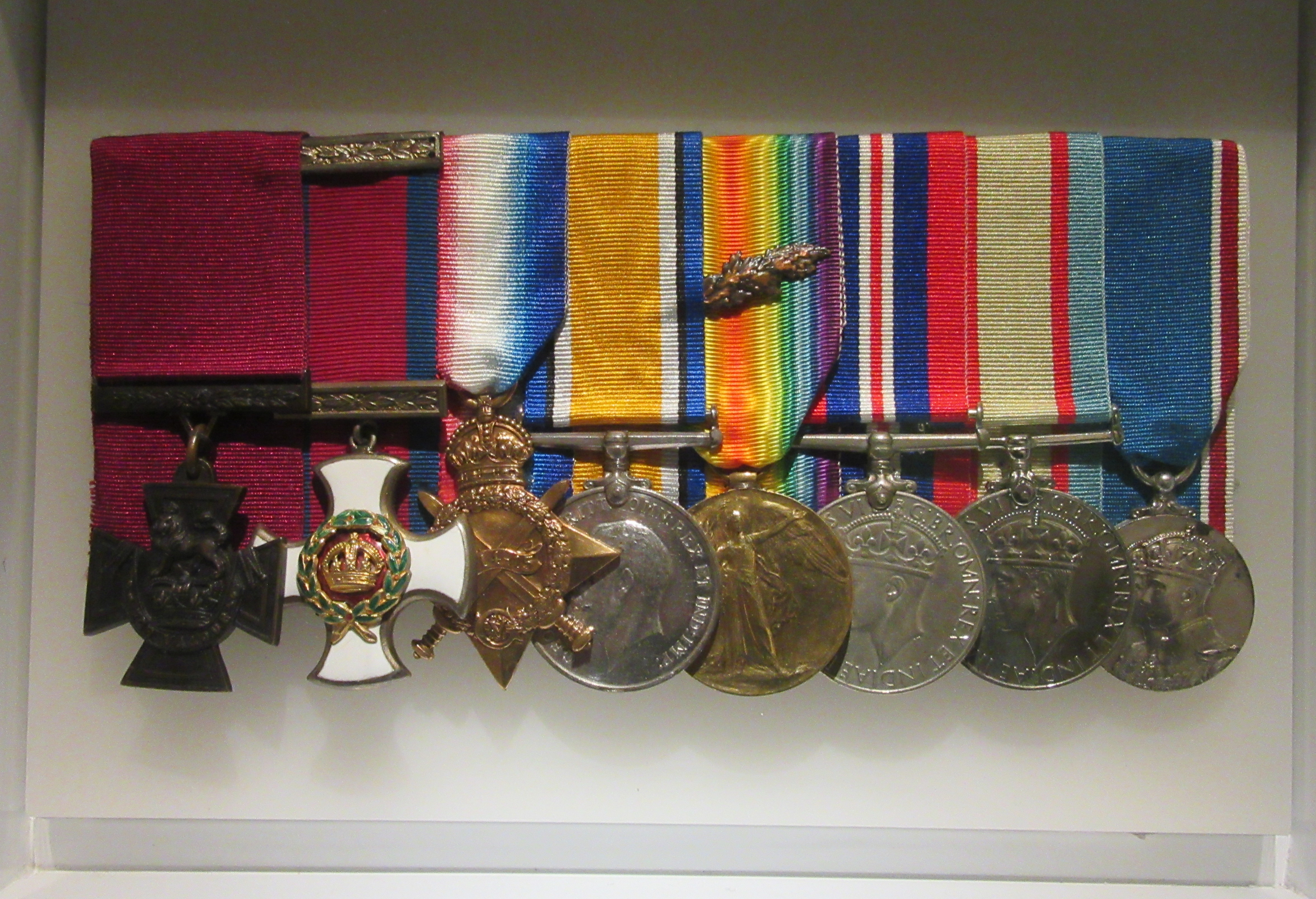
Blair Wark's medals while on temporary display at the Australian War Memorial, Canberra in 2017

The full citation for Wark's Victoria Cross appeared in a supplement to the London Gazette on 26 December 1918, reading:

War Office, 26th December, 1918

His Majesty the KING has been graciously pleased to approve of the award of the Victoria Cross to the undermentioned Officers, N.C.O.'s and Men: —

Maj. Blair Anderson Wark, D.S.O., 32nd Bn., A.I.F.

For most conspicuous bravery, initiative and control during the period 29th Sept. to 1st Oct. 1918, in the operations against the Hindenburg Line at Bellicourt and the advance through Nauroy, Etricourt, Magny La Fosse and Joncourt.

On 29th Sept., after personal reconnaissance under heavy fire, he led his command forward at a critical period and restored the situation. Moving fearlessly at the head of, and at times far in advance of, his troops, he cheered his men on through Nauroy, thence towards Etricourt. Still leading his assaulting companies, he observed a battery of 77mm. guns firing on his rear companies and causing heavy casualties. Collecting a few of his men, he rushed the battery, capturing four guns and ten of the crew. Then moving rapidly forward with only two N.C.O.s, he surprised and captured fifty Germans near Magny La Fosse.

On 1st Oct., 1918, he again showed fearless leading and gallantry in attack, and without hesitation and regardless of personal risk dashed forward and silenced machine guns which were causing heavy casualties.

Throughout he displayed the greatest courage, skilful leading and devotion to duty, and his work was invaluable.

The 32nd Battalion was resting and retraining away from the frontline when the Armistice was signed on 11 November 1918. On 5 January 1919, Wark was granted leave to the United Kingdom, where he accepted his Victoria Cross from King George V on 13 February. Returning to his unit six days later, Wark was then assigned to the 30th Battalion, and sent back to England in preparation for demobilisation. On 31 May 1919, Wark married writer Phyllis Marquiss Munro at St George's Parish Church, Worthing, Sussex; ten days later, he boarded HT Port Lyttleton to return to Australia, where he was discharged from the Australian Imperial Force on 28 September 1919. Two of Wark's brothers also served in the First World War, both in the 56th Battalion; Alexander was a sergeant, and Keith, a recipient of the Distinguished Conduct Medal, rose to the rank of lieutenant.

== Later life ==
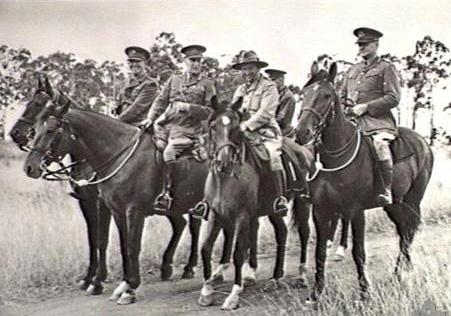
A group of senior Australian military personnel on horseback at Puckapunyal Camp, Victoria, in 1940. Lieutenant Colonel Blair Wark is at the centre.

On demobilisation Wark resumed business as a quantity surveyor in Sydney, later becoming a principal of Thompson & Wark, quantity surveyors. In June 1920, he was in charge of ten fellow Victoria Cross recipients introduced to the Prince of Wales at Government House, during the latter's visit to Australia. Wark became a respected member of Australian society, holding several honorary public positions, including director of the Royal North Shore Hospital, life governor of the New South Wales Benevolent Society, and a councillor of the National Roads and Motorists' Association of New South Wales. He was a committee member of the Hawkesbury River Race Club, as well as holding directorships in insurance and petroleum companies.

In 1922, Wark and Phyllis divorced; five years later, on 10 December 1927, he married Catherine Mary Davis at St Stephen's Presbyterian Church, Sydney. The couple had one son and two daughters. On 17 April 1940, Wark returned to active duty in the Second World War, and was appointed to the 1st Battalion (City of Sydney's Own Regiment) as a major. On 26 July, he was promoted to temporary lieutenant colonel and assumed command of the battalion. While bivouacked at Puckapunyal Camp, Victoria, he died suddenly of coronary heart disease on 13 June 1941. The medical officer attending later concluded: "The cause of death in my opinion was angina pectoris, the fatal attack having been brought on by physical exertion during a night exercise under very cold conditions." Wark was cremated on 16 June at Eastern Suburbs Crematorium, Sydney, after a full military funeral. His Victoria Cross is part of the collections of the Queensland Museum, South Bank, but was loaned to the Australian War Memorial from February 2017 for temporary display in the latter's Hall of Valour during the centenary period of the First World War.
