= 14th Battalion (Australia) =

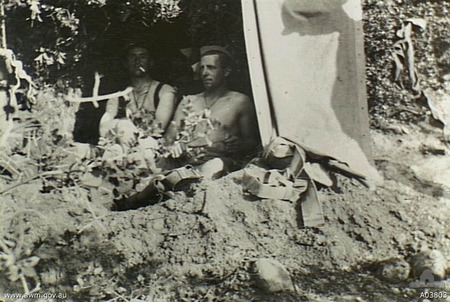
- 14th Battalion soldiers occupy dug outs at Gallipoli
- Active: 1914–1919; 1921–1942
- Country: Australia
- Branch: Australian Army
- Type: Infantry
- Size: ~900–1,000 men (Note: During World War I, the authorised establishment of an Australian infantry battalion was 1,023 men. By the start of World War II, the normal size of an Australian infantry battalion was 910 men all ranks.)
- Part of: 4th Brigade, New Zealand and Australian Division, 4th Brigade, 4th Division; 4th Brigade, 3rd Division
- Nicknames: Prahran Regiment; Jacka's Mob
- Colours: Yellow over black
- Engagements: World War I: Gallipoli campaign; Western Front; World War II

Insignia
- Unit colour patch

The 14th Battalion was an infantry battalion of the Australian Army. Originally raised in 1914 as part of the Australian Imperial Force for service in World War I, the battalion served at Gallipoli initially before being sent to France where it served in the trenches along the Western Front until the end of the war, when it was disbanded. It was raised again in 1921 as a part-time unit of the Citizen Forces based in Victoria. Later, during World War II the battalion was called up for defensive duties to guard against possible Japanese invasion, but in late 1942 it was merged with the 32nd Battalion to become the 14th/32nd Battalion.

== History ==
=== World War I ===
The 14th Battalion was first raised in Melbourne in September 1914 as part of the Australian Imperial Force (AIF), which was an all volunteer force raised for overseas service during World War I. Forming part of the 4th Brigade which was commanded by Colonel John Monash, the battalion was assigned to the New Zealand and Australian Division. After undertaking initial training at Broadmeadows, the battalion embarked for Egypt in December 1914, arriving there the following month.

In Egypt further training was undertaken and then on 25 April 1915 the battalion took part in the landing and subsequent campaign at Gallipoli, where Albert Jacka, then a lance-corporal, earned the Victoria Cross for bravery during a Turkish counterattack in May. For the next two months they undertook defensive operations as the beachhead was established before being committed to the August Offensive during which they were involved in attacks upon Hill 971 and Hill 60. The offensive failed to achieve the breakout that was designed and a period of stalemate followed before the decision was made to evacuate the peninsula in December 1915.

Following this, the battalion was transferred back to Egypt where the AIF underwent a period of reorganisation as decisions were made about their future employment. As a part of this process, the decision was made to raise a number of new units by splitting the previously existing battalions and using their experienced personnel to form new battalions with refresh recruits from Australia. During this time, the 14th Battalion provided a cadre of experienced officers and non-commissioned officers to the newly formed 46th Battalion. It was also reassigned to the newly raised 4th Division.

In mid-1916 the decision was made to transfer elements of the AIF to Europe to take part in the fighting in the trenches along the Western Front. Following their arrival in France in July, the 14th Battalion's first major engagement came in August 1916 when they were committed to the fighting around at Pozières. Over the course of next two and a half years, it was involved in a number of other battles. During April 1917, it took part in the fighting around Bullecourt. In early 1918, they undertook a defensive role, helping to turn back the German spring offensive before taking part in the Allied Hundred Days Offensive, which was launched around Amiens on 8 August 1918. At Amiens, the battalion advanced in the centre of the brigade along the Hamel–Cerisy road amid a blanket of fog, and seized the village of Morcourt in the second phase of the attack along the Australian front. Following the initial attack, the battalion continued further operations as part of the Allied advance. Its final engagement came in late September and early the following month, the units of the Australian Corps were withdrawn from the line and were subsequently in the rear when the Armistice occurred on 11 November 1918.

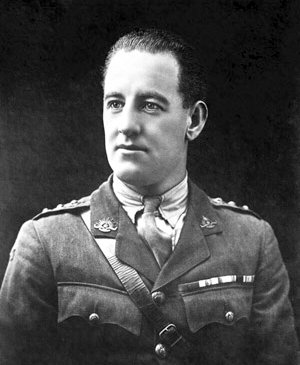
Albert Jacka, who received the 14th Battalion's only Victoria Cross during World War I.

Following the Armistice in November 1918, the battalion began to return to Australia for demobilisation. Total casualties suffered by the battalion during the war included 915 killed and 2,229 wounded. Members of the battalion received the following decorations: one Victoria Cross, one Companion of the Order of the Bath, six Distinguished Service Orders, two Officers of the Orders of the British Empire, 25 Distinguished Conduct Medals, 35 Military Crosses, 143 Military Medals, one British Empire Medal, seven Meritorious Service Medals, 47 Mentions in Despatches, and seven foreign awards. The battalion received a total of 22 battle honours for its actions during the war.

The regimental colour of the 14th Battalion 1st AIF was laid up in St Kilda Town Hall in August 1930. It was presented by Albert Jacka, who served as mayor of the city until he died in office in January 1932.

=== Inter-war years ===
In 1921, as part of a re-organisation of Australia's military forces, the battalion was raised again as part of the Citizen Forces (which was later known as the Militia). Based in the southeast Melbourne area in Victoria and drawing its manpower from three previously existing Citizen Forces units—the 2nd and 5th Battalions of the 14th Infantry Regiment, and 29th (Port Phillip) Light Horse—to the preserve the honours and traditions of the AIF unit, the newly raised battalion adopted its unit colour patch and took custody of the battle honours that they had received during World War I. It also inherited the theatre honour "South Africa 1899–1902", through its predecessor units.

Upon formation, the 14th Battalion was once again placed under the command of the 4th Brigade, however, under the new structure, it was assigned at divisional level to the 3rd Division, which was part of the 3rd Military District (Victoria). Initially, the battalion was brought up to its authorised strength of around 1,000 personnel through the compulsory training scheme; however, in an effort to realise a peace dividend, in 1922 the Army's budget was reduced by 50 per cent and the scope of the training scheme reduced following the resolution of the Washington Naval Treaty. As a result of this, the battalion's authorised strength was reduced to just 409 men of all ranks and training and recruitment efforts were reduced.

In 1927, the territorial designations were introduced into the Citizen Forces and as a result the 14th Battalion adopted the title of the "Prahran Regiment" to reflect its affiliation with the Prahran region. It also adopted the motto "Stand Fast" at this time. The manpower issue became more critical in 1930, as a result of the combined effects of the suspension of the compulsory training scheme and the economic hardships the Great Depression. As the number of recruits available fell even further, the decision was made to amalgamate a number of infantry battalions. Although the 14th Battalion was not affected at this time, nevertheless for most of the 1930s it struggled to maintain its numbers and training opportunities were limited.

=== World War II ===
Upon the outbreak of World War II, the Australian government once again decided to form an all-volunteer force, known as the Second Australian Imperial Force (2nd AIF), for overseas service because the legislative provisions of the Defence Act (1903) prohibited sending the Militia to fight outside of Australian territory. (Note: This stipulation also applied to the 2,800 strong Permanent Military Force. Nevertheless, as the war progressed, 32 Militia battalions were employed on active service during the war, all but three of which were granted AIF status. Essentially this meant that as more than 65 per cent of their wartime establishment had volunteered for service overseas, the battalion could be sent anywhere, including outside of Australian territory.) The role of the Militia at this time was to provide a core of experienced men upon which the 2nd AIF could be raised, as well as providing a structure upon which further mobilisation could be based. In January 1940, the compulsory training scheme was re-established, and Militia units were progressively called up to undertake periods of continuous service throughout 1940 and 1941 to improve the nation's level of military preparedness.

In late 1941, after the Japanese attack on Pearl Harbor and invasion of Malaya, the battalion was called up for full-time war service. Initially, they were used to build and man defences at various locations around Victoria, however, later they were transferred to Western Australia where they became part of the 6th Brigade. By mid-1942, however, due to manpower shortages that occurred in the Australian economy as a result of over mobilisation of its military forces, the Australian government decided to disband a number of Militia units to release their personnel back into the civilian workforce. As a result, in September 1942, while at Geraldton, the 14th Battalion was merged with the 32nd Battalion, to become the 14th/32nd Battalion.

== Battle honours ==
For its service during World War I, the 14th Battalion received the following battle and theatre honours:

- Boer War: South Africa 1899–1902 (inherited);
- World War I: Somme 1916–1918, Pozières, Bullecourt, Messines 1917, Ypres 1917, Menin Road, Polygon Wood, Passchendaele, Arras 1918, Hamel, Amiens, Albert 1918, Hindenburg Line, Epehy, France and Flanders 1916–18, ANZAC, Landing at ANZAC, Defence at ANZAC, Suvla, Sari–Bair, Gallipoli 1915, Egypt 1915–16.

== Commanding officers ==
- Lieutenant Colonel Richard Edmont Courtney;
- Lieutenant Colonel Charles Moreland Montague Dare;
- Lieutenant Colonel Walter John Smith;
- Lieutenant Colonel Henry Arnold Crowther;
- Lieutenant Colonel William Llewellyn Arrell.

== Alliances ==
- United Kingdom – The West Yorkshire Regiment.

== Notes ==
Footnotes

Citations
