= Sir William Kay, 6th Baronet =

British Army officer and baronet (1876–1918)

Brigadier-General Sir William Kay Bt CMG DSO
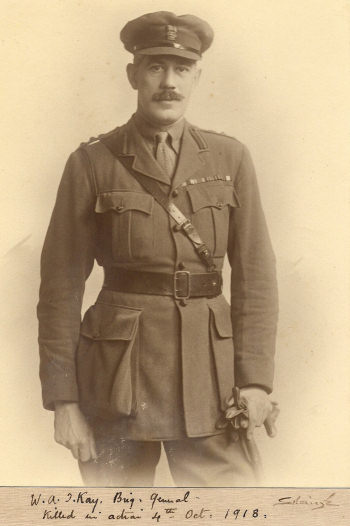
- Born: 21 March 1876; Cheltenham, England
- Died: 4 October 1918 (aged 42) near Magny-la-Fosse, France
- Burial place: Vadencourt British Cemetery, Maissemy, France
- Military career
- Allegiance: United Kingdom
- Branch: British Army
- Service years: 1895–1918
- Rank: Brigadier-General
- Unit: King's Royal Rifle Corps
- Commands: 3rd Brigade
- Conflicts: World War I
- Awards: CMG, DSO

Brigadier-General Sir William Algernon Ireland Kay, 6th Baronet, CMG, DSO (21 March 1876 – 4 October 1918) was a British Army officer. He was killed in action in October 1918 in Magny-la-Fosse, while reconnoitering a new area. At the time, he was in command of the 3rd Brigade.

== Early life ==
Kay was born in 1876, the only son of Sir William Kay, Bart. and his wife, Emily, daughter of Thomas Ireland, of Ousden Hall, Suffolk. He was educated at Harrow School between 1890–1891 and subsequently, at the Royal Military College, Sandhurst in 1895.

== Military service ==
Kay commissioned as a second lieutenant into the King's Royal Rifle Corps in July 1896 and subsequently served in the Hut Tax War of 1898 in Sierra Leone and the Second Boer War, being Mentioned in Dispatches during the latter campaign. During the First World War he deployed to the France in August 1914 as a part of the staff of the Commander of the British Expeditionary Force, Field Marshal Sir John French. He was awarded one of the First Distinguished Service Orders of the First World War for conducting a 'reconnaissance of Great Value on 1 October, reaching a point within 100 yards of the enemy's outposts'. He was wounded in October 1914 and returned to France in Spring 1915 on the Staff of 24th Division, serving at the Battle of Loos. In 1916, he became G.S.O.I to 24th Division and saw further action during the Battle of the Somme and Third Battle of Ypres.

In October 1917, he became Commandant of the Small Arms School in Boulogne, before being appointed as Commander of 2nd Brigade in March 1918, but was again wounded on 17 March 1918. He returned to France in April 1918, to take command of 3rd Brigade and was Killed in Action, alongside his Brigade Major, Captain William Somervail, by a German Gas Shell on 4 October 1918 whilst conducting a reconnaissance near Magny-La-Fosse.

== Burial ==
Brigadier General Kay and Captain Somervail are buried alongside each other at Vadencourt British Cemetery, Maissemy. He died without issue and the Baronetcy became extinct upon his death.

== See also ==
- Kay baronets
