= William Kaye (disambiguation) =

William Kaye (1813–1890) was Mayor of Louisville, Kentucky.

William Kaye may also refer to:

- William Kaye (Australian politician) (c. 1820–1893)
- William Kaye (judge) (1919–2012), Australian judge
- William Kaye (priest) (1822–1913), Archdeacon of Lincoln in the Church of England

== See also ==
- William Kay (disambiguation)
