= Will Kay =

English rugby union player

- Born: William Kay; 28 April 1984 (age 42) Middlesbrough, England
- Height: 1.58 m (5 ft 2 in)
- Weight: 102 kg (16 st 1 lb)

Rugby union career
- Position: Hooker
Senior career
Years	Team	Apps	(Points)
2003	Newcastle Falcons		

Will Kay (born 28 April 1984 in Middlesbrough, England) is a rugby union player. His playing position is Hooker. He has played in the English Premiership, the Celtic League and in the European Challenge Cup.

Kay began his career at Newcastle Falcons, playing for their first team in the 2003–04 season. In 2004, he left Newcastle Falcons to join the Scottish side Border Reivers (rugby). Kay played for Border Reivers in the 2004–05 and 2005–06 seasons. He made his starting debut for Border Reivers on 17 December 2004, against Llanelli Scarlets.

Internationally, Kay has represented Wales at U19 and U21 levels.

Kay married his longtime girlfriend Victoria at Ripon Cathedral on 30 July 2022. A good time was had by all.
