= Kay baronets =

Extinct baronetcy in the Baronetage of the United Kingdom

- Escutcheon of the Kay (initially Watson) baronets of East Sheen
- Creation date: 1803
- Status: extinct
- Extinction date: 1918
- Motto: Fidem parit integritas, Integrity produces confidence

The Watson, later Kay Baronetcy, of East Sheen in the County of Surrey, was a title in the Baronetage of the United Kingdom. It was created on 5 December 1803 for the merchant and soldier Brook Watson, with remainder failing male issue of his own to his great-nephews William Kay and Brook Kay and the male issue of their bodies. Watson died unmarried and was succeeded according to the special remainder by his great-nephew William Kay, the third Baronet. The title became extinct in 1918, when the sixth baronet was killed in action on the Western Front.

== Watson, later Kay baronets, of East Sheen (1803) ==
- Sir Brook Watson, 1st Baronet (died 1807)
- Sir William Kay, 2nd Baronet (died 1850)
- Sir Brook Kay, 3rd Baronet (1780–1866)
- Sir Brook Kay, 4th Baronet (1820–1907)
- Sir William Algernon Kay, 5th Baronet (1837–1914)
- Sir William Algernon Ireland Kay, 6th Baronet (1876–1918)

== See also ==
- Kaye baronets

Baronetage of the United Kingdom
Preceded by Wedderburn baronets	Kay baronets of East Sheen; 5 December 1803	Succeeded by Price baronets
