= SS Indarra =

Passenger liner

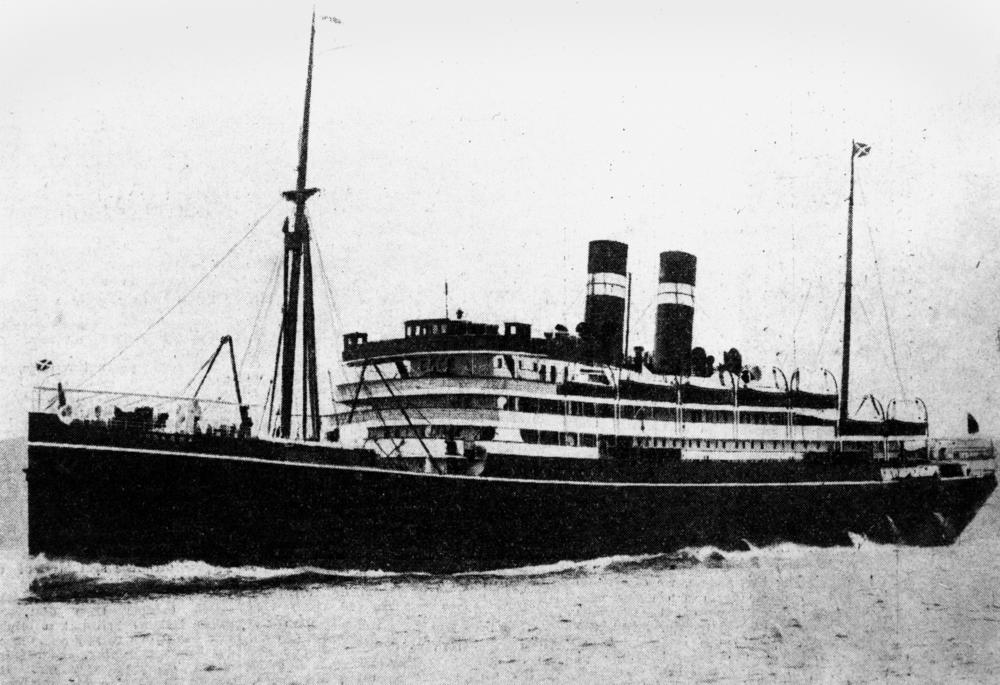
- SS Indarra

History

Australia
- Name: Indarra
- Owner: Australasian United Steam Navigation Company
- Route: Australian coastal
- Builder: William Denny and Brothers, Dumbarton
- Yard number: 966
- Launched: 1 July 1912
- Completed: 6 November 1912
- Maiden voyage: 1913
- Home port: Fremantle
- Fate: Torpedoed and sunk on 1 March 1942

General characteristics
- Type: Ocean liner
- Tonnage: 9,735 GRT
- Length: 450 ft (140 m)
- Beam: 60 ft (18 m)
- Draught: 32 ft 2.75 in (9.82 m)
- Installed power: 1,378 NHP
- Propulsion: Twin quadruple, 2 screws
- Speed: 16 knots (30 km/h; 18 mph)

SS Indarra was a passenger liner built for the Australasian United Steam Navigation Company (A.U.S.N. Co.). It was built in Dumbarton, Scotland in 1912 and was the largest ship on the Australian coastal trade prior to World War I. It was sold in 1920 and, after passing through several other owners, was sunk as a Japanese troopship in 1942.

== Career ==
The SS Indarra was built by William Denny and Brothers, Dumbarton for the Australasian United Steam Navigation Company (A.U.S.N. Co.).

After the First World War she was taken over by the Orient Line to compensate for the loss of vessels on naval service and to accommodate the high demand for passage from London to Australia. In October 1920 the ship was purchased by the Compagnie Maritime Belge and renamed Pays de Waes. It had been planned for a River Plate service and it sailed in 1921 to Buenos Aires, Argentina. The company also launched a Belgium–South Africa service using the vessel with Prince Leopold amongst passengers on the first voyage.

In 1923, Pays de Waes was repossessed by A.U.S.N. Co. and sold to Osaka Shosen Kaisha and renamed Horai Maru. The accommodation was altered to 51 First Class, 123 Second Class and 553 Third Class (later increased to 669 Third Class).

== Fate ==
On 1 March 1942, the Horai Maru came under Allied air attack in the Battle of the Java Sea. In the midst of the battle, the Japanese cruiser Mogami fired a spread of Long Lance torpedoes with the American cruiser USS Houston as their intended target. The torpedoes missed the Houston and instead sank the minesweeper W-2 and Horai Maru, while also hitting the Ryuho Maru, Tatsuno Maru and Sakura Maru, with the latter three ending up beached. The shot has been described as the best shot of torpedoes ever recorded, hitting five friendly ships at the same time.

The wreck of the Horai Maru was retrieved for salvage in 1947.

== Gallery ==
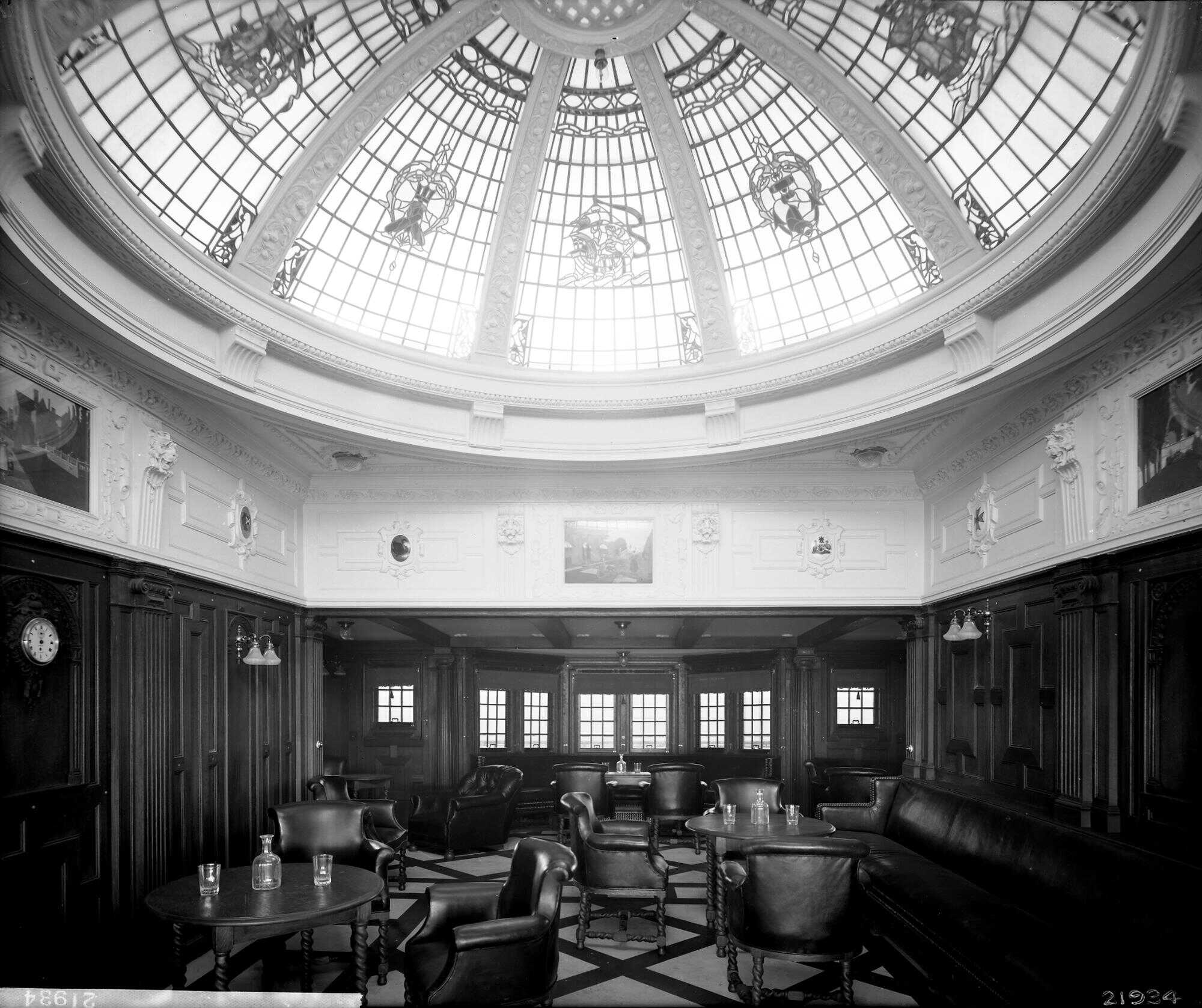
First Class Smoking Room

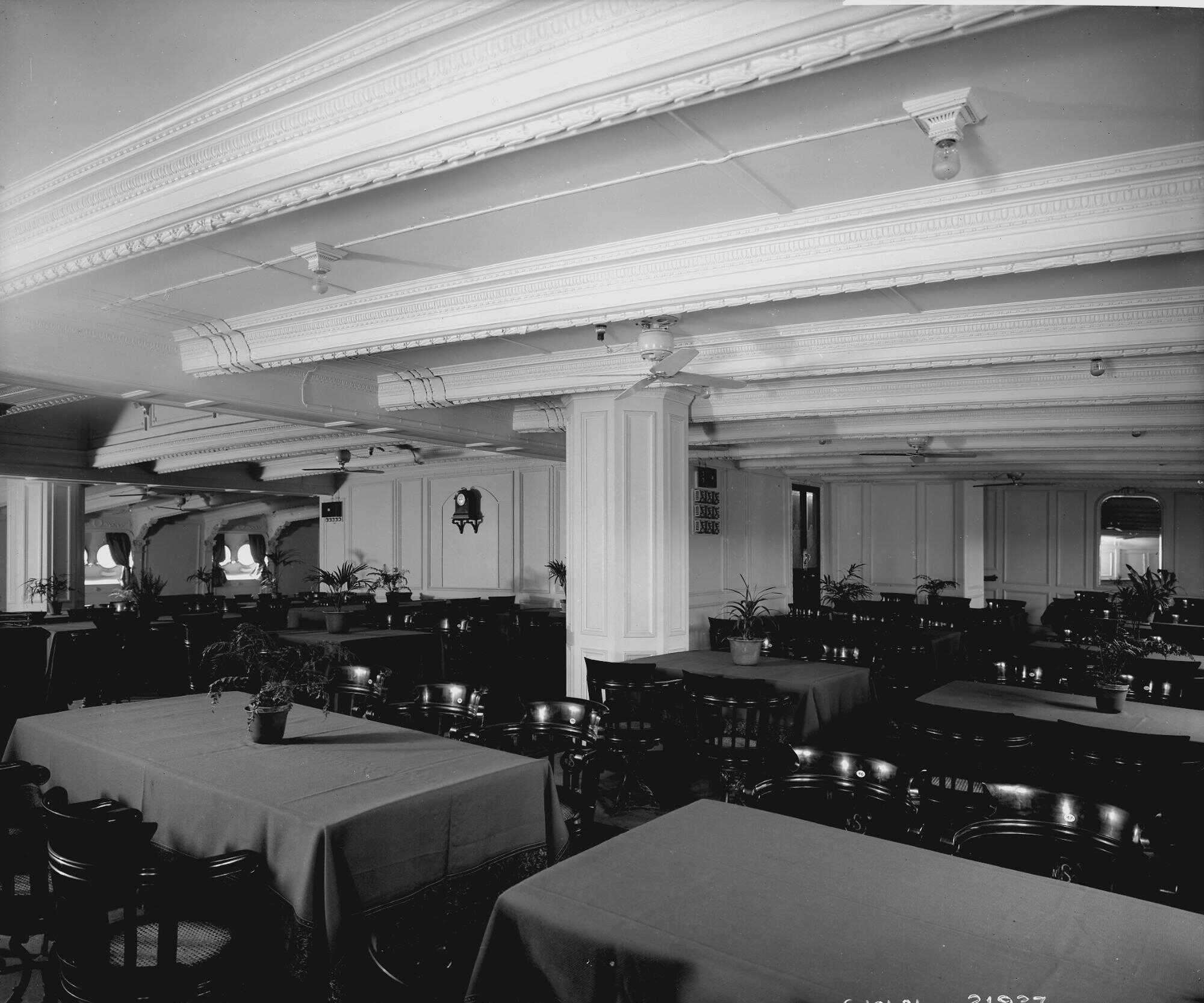
Second Class Dining Saloon

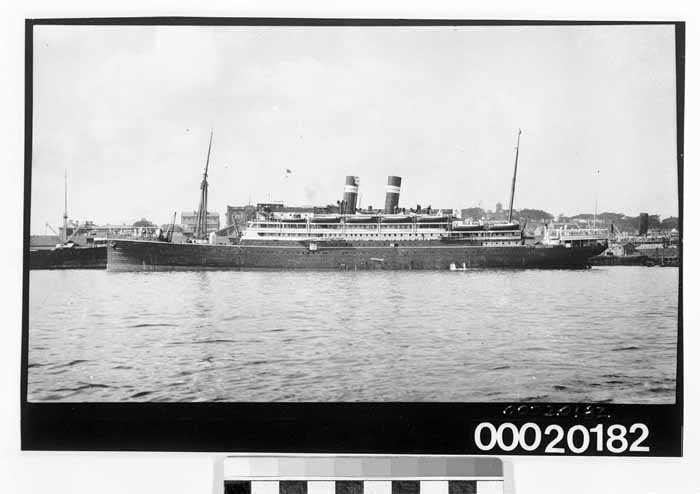
Indarra at Walsh Bay, Sydney
