= Magny-la-Fosse =

- Commune
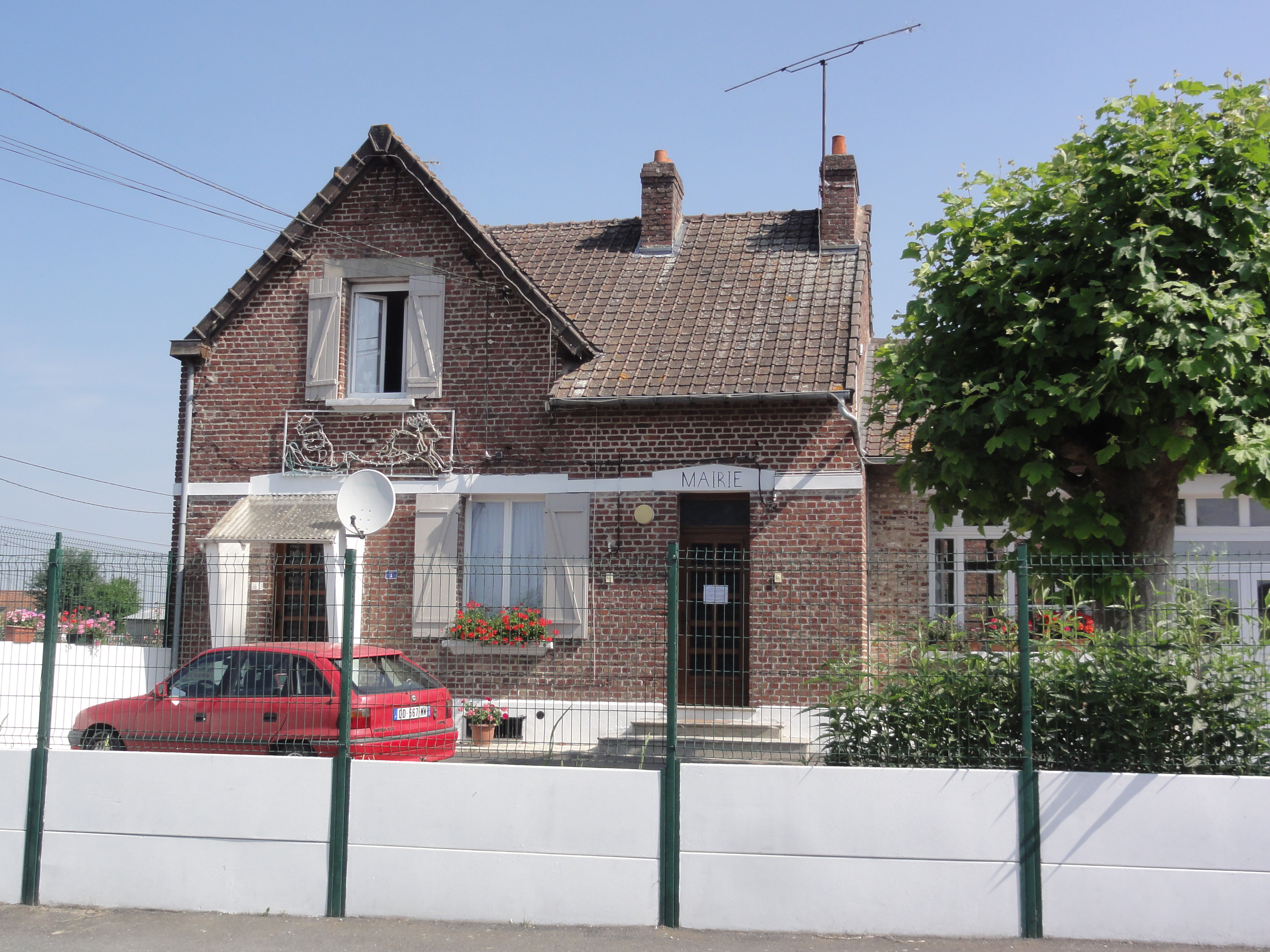
- The town hall of Magny-la-Fosse
- Location of Magny-la-Fosse
- Location within France Location within Hauts-de-France
- Coordinates: 49°56′04″N 3°16′31″E
- Country: France
- Region: Hauts-de-France
- Department: Aisne
- Arrondissement: Saint-Quentin
- Canton: Bohain-en-Vermandois
- Intercommunality: Pays du Vermandois

Government
  - Mayor (2026–32): Yannick Camus
- Area^{1}: 3.63 km^{2} (1.40 sq mi)
- Elevation: 103 m (338 ft)
- Highest elevation: 144 m (472 ft)
- Lowest elevation: 92 m (302 ft)
- Population (2023): 122
  - Density: 33.6/km^{2} (87.0/sq mi)
- Time zone: UTC+01:00 (CET)
  - Summer (DST): UTC+02:00 (CEST)
- INSEE/Postal code: 02451 /02420
- ^{1} French Land Register data, which excludes lakes, ponds, glaciers > 1 km^{2} (0.386 sq mi or 247 acres) and river estuaries.

Magny-la-Fosse (French pronunciation: [maɲi la fos]) is a commune in the Aisne department in Hauts-de-France in northern France.

== Population ==
Historical population
Year	Pop.	±% p.a.
1968	139	—
1975	131	−0.84%
1982	145	+1.46%
1990	160	+1.24%
1999	141	−1.39%
2007	130	−1.01%
2012	127	−0.47%
2017	125	−0.32%
2023	122	−0.40%
Source: INSEE

== See also ==
- Communes of the Aisne department
