= William H. Harrison (USMC) =

U.S. Marine Corps Brigadier General

William Hartwell Harrison
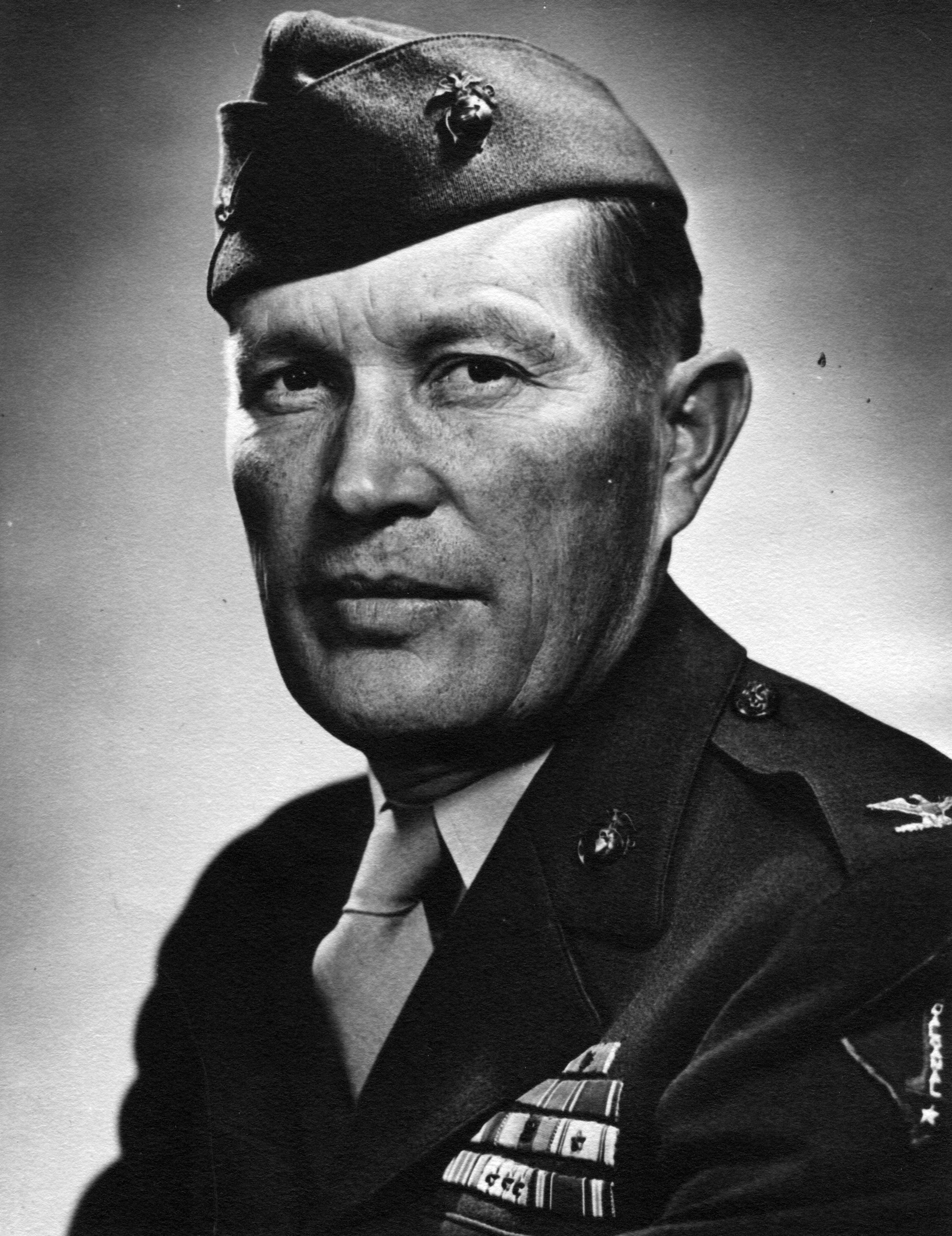
- Harrison as colonel, USMC
- Born: October 7, 1896; Middle River, Maryland, US
- Died: August 19, 1955 (aged 58)
- Burial place: Arlington National Cemetery
- Military career
- Allegiance: United States
- Branch: United States Marine Corps
- Service years: 1917–1948
- Rank: Brigadier general
- Service number: 0-402
- Commands: 11th Marine Regiment; 12th Defense Battalion; 2nd Battalion, 10th Marines
- Conflicts: World War I Banana Wars: Dominican Campaign; Haitian Campaign; World War II: Woodlark Island occupation; Battle of Cape Gloucester; Battle of Peleliu
- Awards: Legion of Merit; Bronze Star Medal

William Hartwell Harrison (October 7, 1896 – August 19, 1955) was a decorated officer of United States Marine Corps with the rank of brigadier general. He is most noted as commanding officer of 11th Marine Regiment during Battle of Peleliu in September 1944. Harrison later commanded the Automotive Section within Service Command, Fleet Marine Force Pacific.

== Early career ==
William H. Harrison was born on October 7, 1896, at Middle River, Maryland. He attended the St. John's College at Annapolis, Maryland, before he reported for Marine Corps active duty with the rank of second lieutenant on May 24, 1917. Harrison was sent to the Basic School for additional officers training and subsequently was attached to the 13th Marine Regiment and sailed for France. He arrived in September 1918, but too late to see combat and spent almost nine months with occupation duties in Brest. Harrison was ordered back to the United States in July 1919 and following the deactivation of the unit, he was attached to the Second Provisional Marine Brigade under Brigadier General Ben H. Fuller. His first expeditionary duties came in October 1919, when he sailed with 2nd Brigade for Santo Domingo to fight rebel forces of General Desiderio Arias.

Harrison spent two years in Dominican Republic and finally returned stateside in 1921. He was assigned to the Marine Barracks Quantico, Virginia. He was assigned to the 10th Marine Artillery Regiment and participated in the maneuvers at Culebra, Puerto Rico. Lieutenant Harrison was later assigned for instruction to the Motor Transport School at Camp Holabird, Maryland.

Another foreign shore duty came in July 1922, when he sailed as first lieutenant for Haiti as a member of First Marine Brigade under Brigadier General Theodore P. Kane. During his time there, he served as Brigade Transportation Officer until September 1927. His main responsibility as Transportation officer was the movement of personnel and material by truck, rail and sea.

He subsequently returned to Quantico, where he was assigned again as Transportation officer because of his experiences with transportation of the troops. Harrison remained at Quantico until June 1929, when he was promoted to the rank of captain and appointed commanding officer of the Marine detachment aboard the battleship USS New Mexico. While aboard that vessel, he participated in patrol cruises in the Atlantic and the Pacific Oceans until July 1931.

Captain Harrison was subsequently assigned to the Battery Officer's Course at Field Artillery School at Fort Sill, Oklahoma, where he also attended later the Advanced Course. He graduated in May 1933 and joined 21st Reserve Marines at Philadelphia Navy Yard.

== Later career and World War II ==
Harrison was ordered to sunny California in January 1936 and assigned as major to the Marine Corps Base San Diego. He assumed duties as executive officer of the 2nd Battalion, 10th Marine Artillery Regiment and later served also as 2nd Battalion Commander from May to June 1938. He then spent two years in Pacific, when he was appointed commanding officer of the Marine barracks at Naval Station Guam in June 1939. Harrison returned stateside in June 1941 and joined again 1st Battalion, 10th Marines at San Diego under Lieutenant Colonel Raphael Griffin.

But with the Japanese attack on Pearl Harbor, the new units were activated and Harrison assumed command of 12th Defense Battalion at the beginning of August 1942 also at San Diego. His unit consisted of 1500 men of coastal defense and anti-aircraft units and was almost immediately ordered to Hawaii. During May 1943, Harrison sailed with 12th Defense Battalion to Samoa and subsequently to Australia. He led his unit during the Operation Chronicle, assault and subsequent occupation of Woodlark Island at the end of June 1943. The Island was unoccupied, but Japanese conducted few shelling and bombing attacks.

Harrison later led 12th Defense battalion during the Battle of Cape Gloucester at New Guinea at the end of December 1944 until he was replaced by Merlyn D. Holmes and appointed commanding officer of 11th Marine Artillery Regiment within 1st Marine Division under Major General William H. Rupertus. His regiment was designated artillery group for the Peleliu Operation in September 1944 and even with a minimum of motor transportation available, Harrison coordinated artillery shelling on well entrenched enemy forces. His actions destroyed a large number of Japanese units, and this helped to win the campaign. For his actions and leadership during the battle, Harrison received the Legion of Merit with Combat "V" and also the Navy Presidential Unit Citation.

In December 1944, Harrison was ordered back to the United States and appointed officer in charge of Automotive Section within Service Command, Fleet Marine Force Pacific under Major General Earl C. Long. In this assignment, he was responsible again for the movement of personnel, weapons and supplies by trucks, air and sea. Harrison remained in this capacity until the end of the war and later received the Bronze Star Medal for his service.

== Retirement ==
Harrison returned stateside in January 1946 and assumed duties as officer in charge of Western and North-Eastern Recruiting Divisions at San Francisco and Philadelphia. He retired from the active service on April 1, 1948, after 31 years of military service and was advanced to the rank of brigadier general for having been specially commended in combat.

Harrison died on August 19, 1955, and is buried at Arlington National Cemetery together with his wife Blanche Moe Harrison (1895–1972) and their son William Hartwell Harrison (1922–1940).

== Decorations ==
Here is the ribbon bar of Brigadier General William H. Harrison:

1st Row	Legion of Merit with Combat "V"		Bronze Star Medal	
2nd Row	Navy Presidential Unit Citation	Navy Unit Commendation	Marine Corps Expeditionary Medal with one star	World War I Victory Medal with one battle clasp
3rd Row	American Defense Service Medal with Fleet Clasp	American Campaign Medal	Asiatic-Pacific Campaign Medal with three service stars	World War II Victory Medal

Military offices
Preceded by Robert H. Pepper	Commanding Officer of 11th Marine Regiment; February 1, 1944 - November 3, 1944	Succeeded by Wilburt S. Brown
