= Naval Base Woodlark Island =

World War 2 base in New Guinea

- Naval Base Woodlark Island

- Location within Papua New Guinea

Geography
- Location: Milne Bay Province
- Coordinates: 9.225285°S 152.941932°E

Administration
- Papua New Guinea
- Naval Base: United States Navy (1943-1945)

Naval Base Woodlark Island in 1944

Naval Base Woodlark Island was a United States Navy base built during World War II on Woodlark Island on Papua New Guinea. The US Navy built a PT boat base, boat repair depot, and harbor facilities at the city of Guasopa to support the Pacific War in 1943. The Harbor facilities was also built to support the US Navy in building the Narewa Airfield on the island. The base was part of the New Guinea campaign.

== History ==
On June 21, 1943, American forces came ashore on southern New Georgia, and then on June 30, landed on Woodlark Island as part of Operation Chronicle. Guasopa Bay lacked a usable dock so the landing were done with LST landing ships. Landing with the United States Army and United States Marine Corps at Guasopa was the US Navy's Seabee 60th Construction Battalion, and the 20th Construction. The 500 men with the 60th Construction Battalion started work on the airfield and its facilities. The 200 men with the 20th Construction Battalion started work on the harbor, barracks, mess halls, roads, water plant and other services.

At Guasopa Bay Harbor a pontoon pier was built. The PT boat base, and boat repair depot was completed. A sawmill was built to supply lumber for the harbor and airfield needs. A coral quarry was built to build roads, walkways and runways.

Airfield construction started on July 2, after 12 days a 3,000-foot fighter plane runway was completed. On September 15, the runway was lengthened to 6,500-feet and bombers began use of the runway. The airfield was called Narewa Airfield, but also called Woodlark Island Airfield and Guasopa Airfield. After the war, the airfield became Guasopa Airport.

Japan had airbases close enough that there were some bombings at Guasopa during construction. The bombings caused minor damage and no casualties to the construction crews.

All construction was completed on November 1, 1943, and most of the Seabees departed Naval Base Woodlark Island. A maintenance crew of 309 men with the 60th Battalion stayed at Naval Base Woodlark Island until March 1944.

Naval Base Woodlark Island Feet Post Office, FPO# is 528 SF Woodlark Island.

== See also ==
- US Naval Advance Bases
- Naval Base Port Moresby
- Naval Base Milne Bay
- US Naval Base New Guinea

== Gallery ==
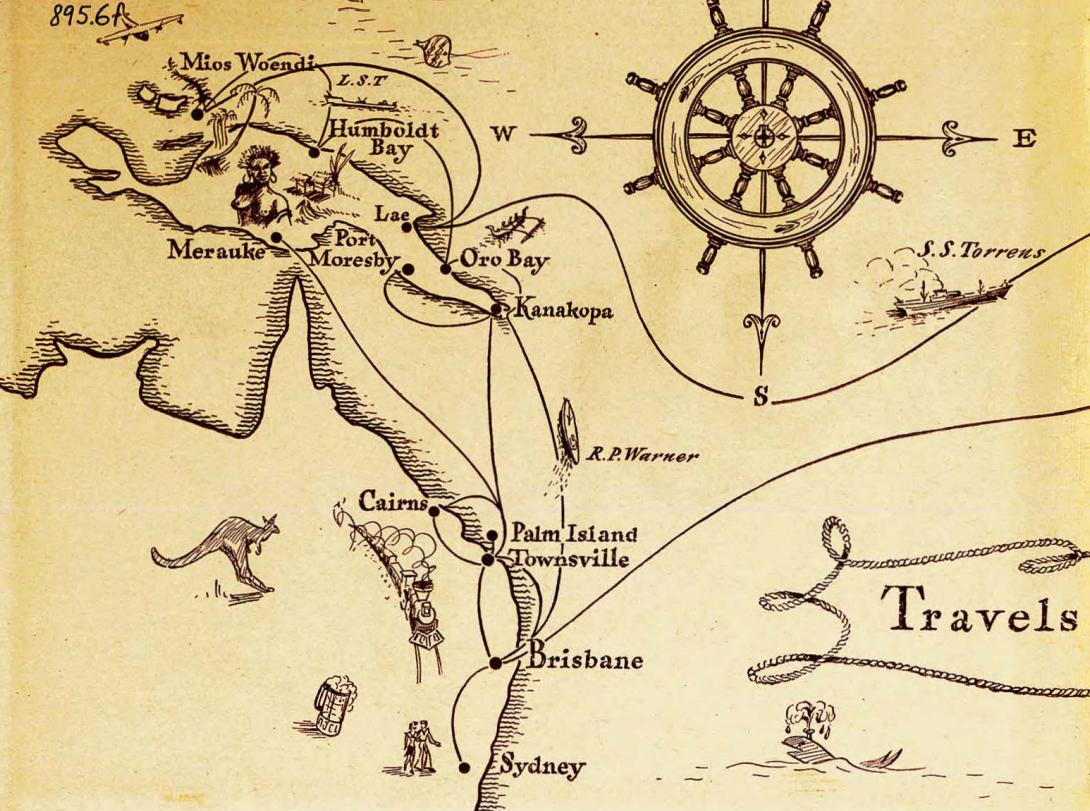
Camp Seabee Naval Base Brisbane building trips map

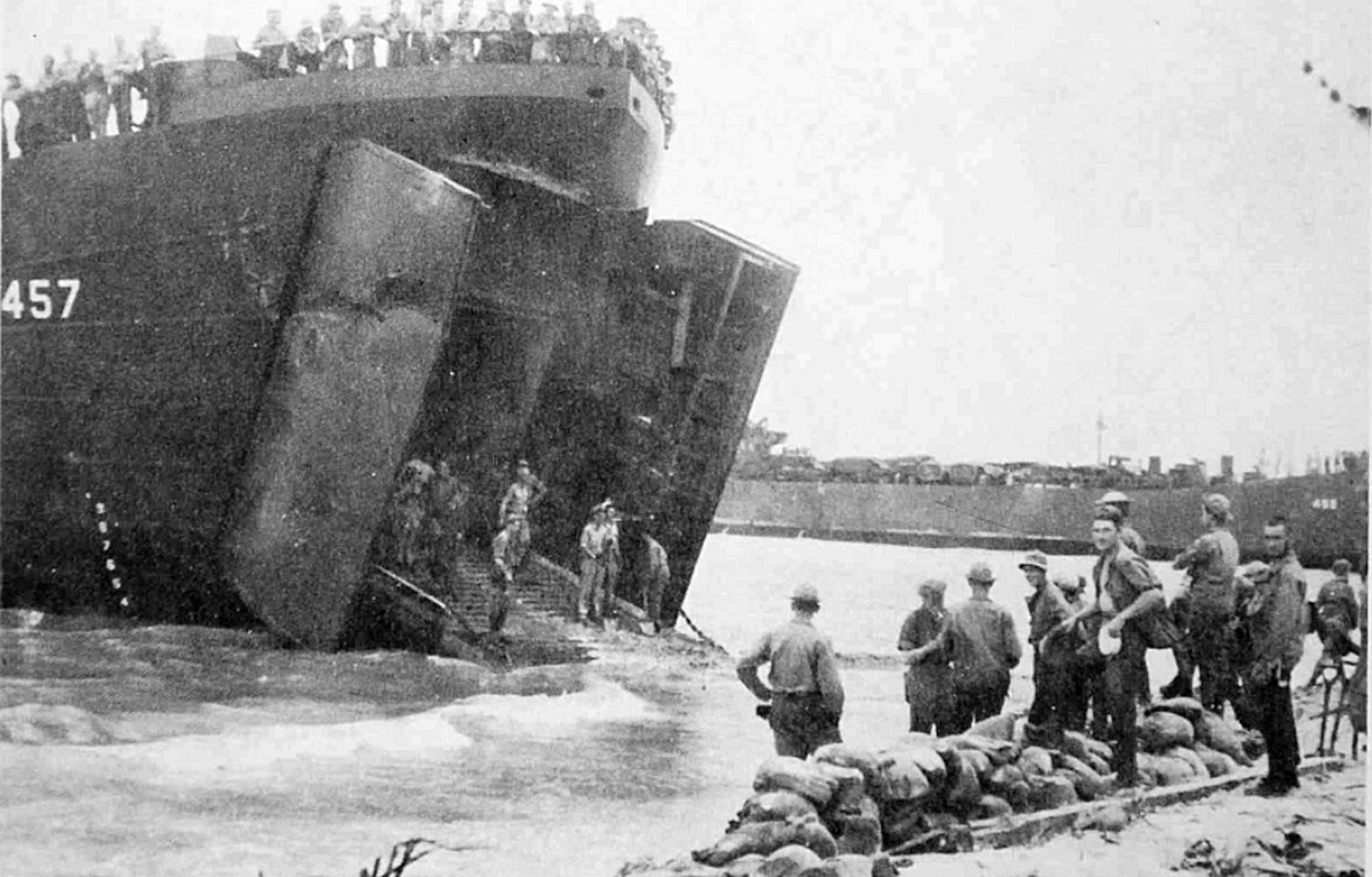
USS Achilles (ARL-41) in 1943 at Naval Base Woodlark Island

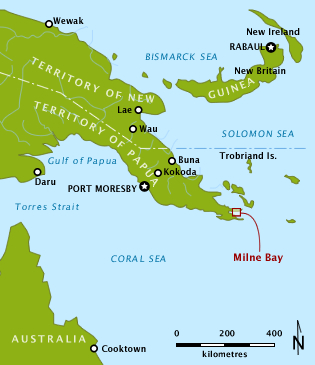
Naval Base Woodlark Island was supported by nearby Naval Base Milne Bay

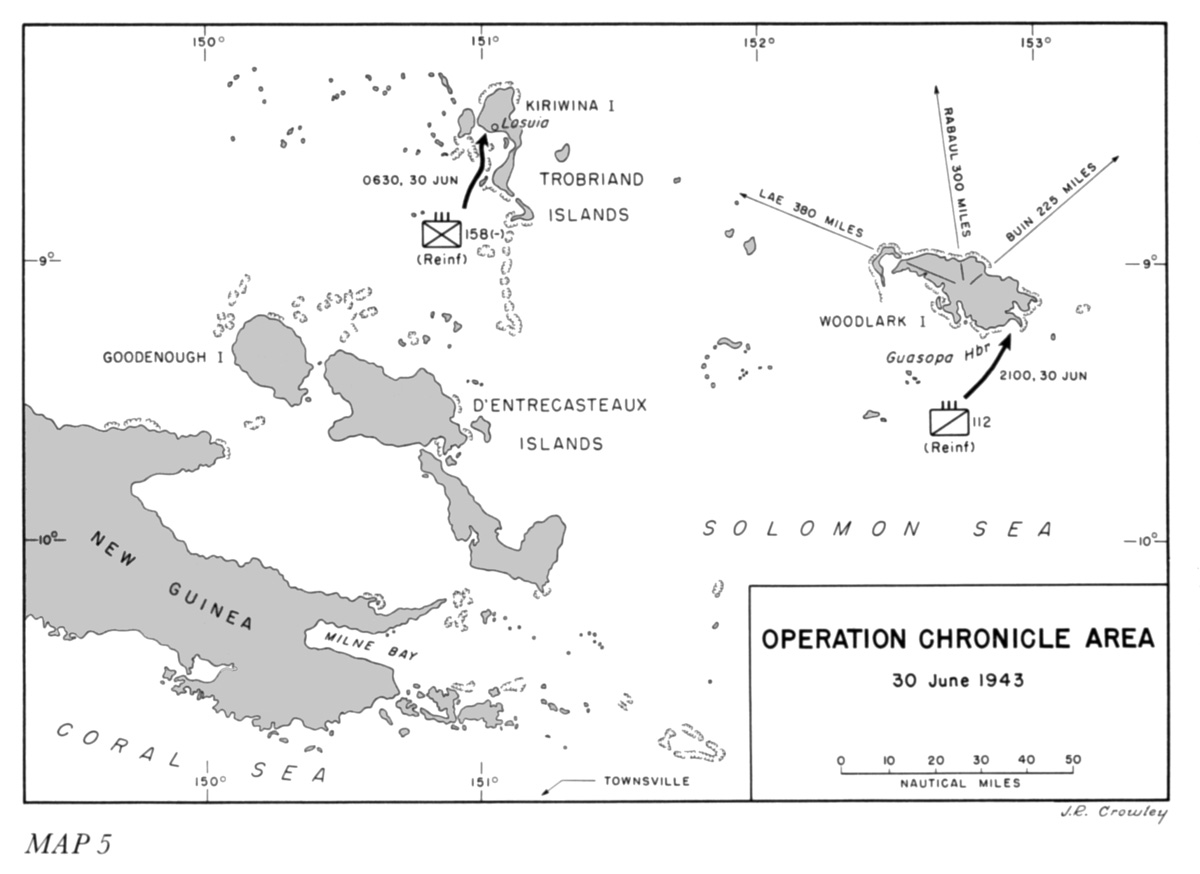
Map Naval Base Woodlark Island and Woodlark Harbor 1943

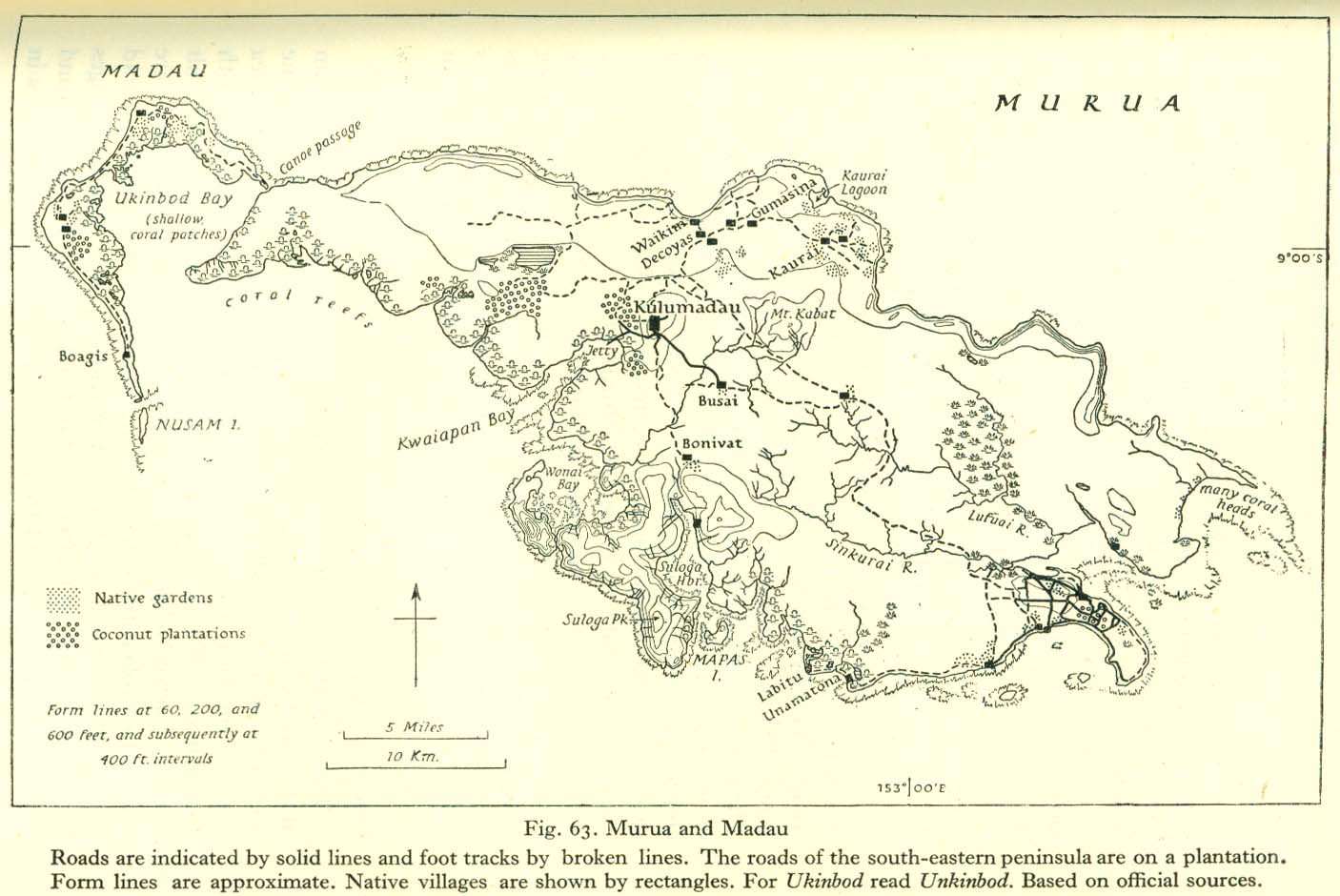
Map Woodlark Island 1945
