= USS Humphreys =

Clemson-class destroyer

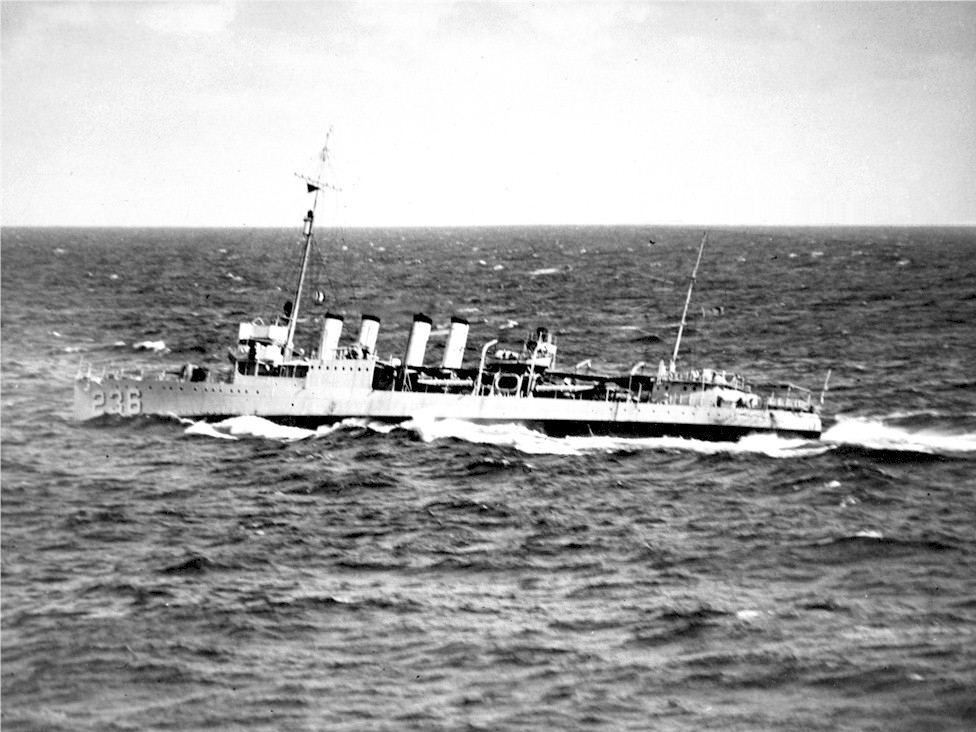
- USS Humphreys (DD-236) in the mid-1930s

History

United States
- Namesake: Joshua Humphreys
- Builder: New York Shipbuilding
- Laid down: 31 July 1918
- Launched: 28 July 1919
- Commissioned: 21 July 1920
- Decommissioned: 26 October 1945
- Stricken: 13 November 1945
- Honors and awards: 7 battle stars
- Fate: Sold for scrap, 26 August 1946

General characteristics
- Class & type: Clemson-class destroyer
- Displacement: 1,190 tons
- Length: 314 feet 5 inches (95.83 m)
- Beam: 31 feet 8 inches (9.65 m)
- Draft: 9 feet 3 inches (2.82 m)
- Propulsion: 26,500 shp (20 MW); geared turbines, 2 screws
- Speed: 35 knots (65 km/h)
- Range: 4,900 nautical miles (9,100 km); @ 15 kt
- Complement: 101 officers and enlisted
- Armament: 4 x 4 in (102 mm)/50 guns, 1 x 3 in (76 mm)/25 gun, 2 x .30 cal (7.62 mm), 12 x 21 inch (533 mm) tt.

USS Humphreys (DD-236/APD-12) was a Clemson-class destroyer in the United States Navy during World War II. She was named for Joshua Humphreys, a pioneer US shipbuilder.

== Construction and commissioning ==
Humphreys was launched 28 July 1919 by New York Shipbuilding Corporation; sponsored by Miss Letitia A. Humphreys, great-granddaughter of Joshua Humphreys; and commissioned at Philadelphia 21 July 1920.

== 1920s ==
After completing her shakedown training in New England waters, Humphreys sailed 14 August for special duty in the Mediterranean. For the next year she operated primarily in the eastern Mediterranean with Turkish ships, protecting American and Turkish interests in the area during the conflict which followed the Russian Revolution. Humphreys did surveying work and acted as station and communications ship. In November 1920 she evacuated civilians from the Crimea during the last stages of the Russian Civil War, and, until August 1921, operated off Palestine, Turkey, and Egypt on maneuvers. She sailed from Constantinople 6 August 1921, arriving Newport, Rhode Island 23 August, and spent the rest of the year in training operations.

Humphreys spent the next 2 years on ship and fleet training exercises in Atlantic and Caribbean waters. She sailed 21 January 1925 via the Panama Canal Zone for San Diego, California, and after her arrival 12 March took part in important fleet maneuvers off the California coast. In June she returned to New York and her regular schedule of training in the Caribbean. Humphreys maintained this operational pattern until decommissioning at Philadelphia 10 January 1930, taking part in annual reserve training cruises during the summers 1926–29.

== 1930s ==
Humphreys recommissioned at Philadelphia 13 June 1932, and sailed 15 August for maneuvers on the West Coast. The ship took part in two fleet problems, vital tools in perfecting equipment and tactics, before sailing 19 April 1934 for New York. Upon her arrival 31 May Humphreys resumed her readiness operations on the East Coast, taking part in a fleet exercise off Haiti in October. From the Caribbean the ship returned to San Diego 8 November 1934 and for the next year took part in important carrier training exercises in the Pacific. Acting as screen ship and plane guard, Humphreys helped perfect the tactics of aircraft carrier warfare which were to exert a strong influence on the coming war. She remained on the West Coast, with occasional voyages to Pearl Harbor and Midway, until she was decommissioned at San Diego on 14 September 1938.

Humphreys recommissioned once more 26 September 1939 as the beginning of the war in Europe necessitated an increase in America's readiness. Humphreys conducted shakedown off San Diego and sailed 13 November to join the Neutrality Patrol in the Caribbean, designed to protect American shipping. During May and June 1940 the ship took part in a sound school at Newport to improve her antisubmarine capability, and sailed 4 December from Norfolk, Virginia for San Diego, where she arrived 2 days before Christmas. There she continued Neutrality Patrol duty and engaged in antisubmarine training off California.

== World War II ==
Humphreys was in San Diego when the Japanese attack on Pearl Harbor brought the United States into the war 7 December 1941. During the critical early months she operated as a coastal escort ship between San Pedro and Seattle, Washington but in May she sailed northward to Kodiak, Alaska, arriving 31 May 1942. In the bleak Aleutian Islands she escorted transports, patrolled American-held islands, and engaged in exercises with Honolulu, Indianapolis, and several destroyers. Humphreys arrived at San Francisco 11 November and entered Mare Island Navy Yard for conversion to high-speed transport.

She was reclassified APD-12 on 1 December 1942; and, following shakedown training, arrived at Pearl Harbor 31 December to prepare for duty in the western Pacific. After amphibious training in Hawaiian waters, the ship sailed to Noumea 22 January 1943 and began ferrying troops and supplies from advance bases to Guadalcanal, Tulagi, and Florida Island. During these critical months as the ship repeatedly steamed to the Solomon Islands in support of amphibious assaults, she often fought off bombing and strafing attacks by Japanese aircraft.

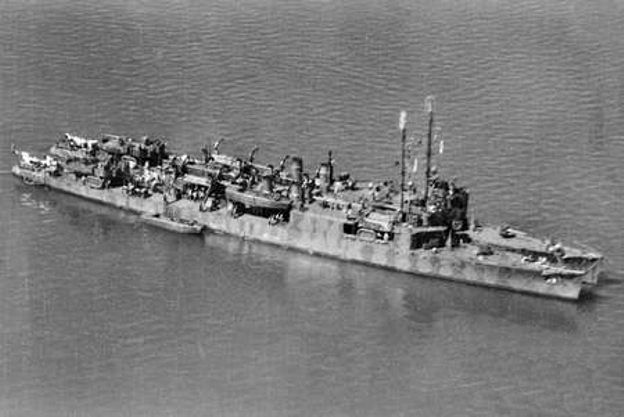
USS Humphreys (APD-12) and USS Sands (APD-13) at Townsville in May 1943.

After training landings Humphreys embarked elements of the 1st Cavalry Division at Nouméa and transported them to Townsville, Australia, in preparation for Operation Chronicle, landings on Woodlark and Kiriwina Islands. Arriving Townsville 20 May 1943, the ship sailed for Milne Bay 21 June, and from there landed troops and equipment on Woodlark 23 June without enemy opposition. This first landing of the long New Guinea campaign was also the first for Admiral Daniel E. Barbey's 7th Fleet Amphibious Force ("VII Phib"), and provided invaluable experience for the numerous amphibious operations to come.

Humphreys sailed to Brisbane for repairs during July and August, and returned to Milne Bay 15 August 1943. There she prepared for VII Phib's next move up the coast of New Guinea to Lae. After putting their troops ashore early 4 September, the high-speed transports remained off the beach to protect landing craft from Japanese air attack. The Australian troops landed by Humphreys and the other ships soon took Lae, and the ship departed 7 September with casualties for Buna. On the 10th she returned with three other transports for a night sweep of Huon Gulf, driving away supply barges and bombarding Japanese positions around Lae.

Next on Barbey's amphibious timetable in New Guinea was Finschhafen, where Humphreys and her sister ships carried out a surprise landing 22 September. After bringing reinforcements 8 days later, the ship took casualties to Buna 8 October and arrived at Goodenough Island 19 October for amphibious exercises.

Seizure of New Britain was vital to the advance toward the Philippines as it provided control of the strategic Vitiaz and Dampier Straits. The first step of the operation was to gain control of the harbor at Arawe. Humphreys sailed with other amphibious units for southern New Britain, arriving 15 December; put ashore elements of the 112th Cavalry Regiment in rubber boats to seize harbor islands; then stood offshore to provide gunfire support before retiring to Buna that afternoon.

Humphreys also took part in the Cape Gloucester landings 26 December, remaining in the Cape Sudest area into February 1944. She then sailed for the landings in the Admiralties 27 February, arriving off Los Negros 2 days later. Humphreys landed troops at Hyane; steamed to Cape Sudest; and, when resistance stiffened in early March, returned off Hyane with reinforcements.

In April the ship began preparations for the three-pronged amphibious attack on central New Guinea, the Hollandia operation. Humphreys landed troops at Humboldt Bay 22 April against light opposition, and remained off the beaches providing gunfire support. Following the assault, she returned to Buna and sailed 12 May for the United States.

She arrived at San Francisco 30 May, and was converted to carry "frogmen," the Navy's skilled Underwater Demolition Teams. Sailing again 30 July, Humphreys trained in Hawaiian waters before sailing to Manus 28 September to join the invasion fleet for the return to the Philippines. Sailing 12 October, she carried UDT Team No. 5 to the Leyte beaches 18 October, remaining close in to provide fire support during this reconnaissance. Next day she patrolled Leyte Gulf for Japanese submarines, and continued this work during the main landings 20 October 1944. The veteran ship assisted in shooting down a bomber 21 October before sailing in convoy for Manus.

The invasion of Luzon was next on Humphreys' schedule. After stopping at Noumea and Hollandia, she sortied from the Palaus 1 January 1945 with the Lingayen invasion group. Steaming through the Philippines the ships encountered suicide attacks and shot down many planes. These attacks became more intense as Humphreys entered Lingayen Gulf 6 January; and next day as her UDT team swam ashore for vital reconnaissance work, the ship provided gunfire cover. She remained in the Gulf until sailing with a convoy 10 January, one day after the main landings.

The ship arrived at Ulithi 23 January 1945 and took on a new duty, screening logistics groups during at-sea replenishment and refueling of the wide-ranging carrier striking forces. She screened refueling operations for 5th Fleet escort carriers covering the Iwo Jima landings, then steamed on to Iwo Jima itself 8 March 1945. There Humphreys acted as screening ship until arriving Leyte with a convoy 17 March.

== Fate ==
As an important preliminary to the main landings on Okinawa, Humphreys took part in the assault of Keise Shima 31 March, screening LST's and performing escort duties until 3 April when she sailed for Ulithi. This last and largest of Pacific landings was then well underway, and the ship escorted resupply convoys from Ulithi to bitterly contested Okinawa until returning to Pearl Harbor 4 June 1945. From there she sailed to San Diego where she was reclassified DD-236 on 20 July 1945. Humphreys decommissioned 26 October 1945 and was sold for scrap 26 August 1946 to National Metal & Steel Corporation, Terminal Island, Calif.
