= Nusam =

Island in Papua New Guinea

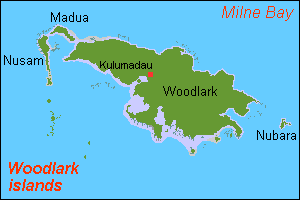

- Location within Papua New Guinea

Geography
- Location: Melanesia
- Coordinates: 9°6′0″S 152°25′33.9″E
- Archipelago: Woodlark Islands
- Adjacent to: Solomon Sea
- Highest elevation: 17 m (56 ft)

Administration
- Papua New Guinea
- Province: Milne Bay Province

Nusam Island is an island in Papua New Guinea located in Milne Bay. It is situated 4 km (2 miles) south of Boagis and 6 km (4 miles) north of Nanon Islands.

8 km (5 miles) north-east is Kudul Point.
