= Neargyria persimilis =

Scientific classification
- Kingdom: Animalia
- Phylum: Arthropoda
- Class: Insecta
- Order: Lepidoptera
- Family: Crambidae
- Subfamily: Crambinae
- Tribe: incertae sedis
- Genus: Neargyria
- Species: N. persimilis

Binomial name
- Neargyria persimilis Hampson, 1919

Species of moth

Neargyria persimilis is a moth in the family Crambidae. It was described by George Hampson in 1919. It is found in Papua New Guinea, where it has been recorded from the D'Entrecasteaux Islands of Goodenough Island and Woodlark Island.
