= Kulumadau =

Coordinates: 9°05′S 152°43′E

Kulumadau is a large, rural non-village (as per the official 1990 Woodlark Island census) on Woodlark Island, Milne Bay Province Papua New Guinea. It is served by Guasopa Airport. Its population during the 1990 census was 242, though it has since grown extensively; its current population is reported to be about 2,500 people, but there are no official sources for this number, as the last official census was taken in 1990 (this is the case in many rural islands of Milne Bay). There is a large primary school in Kulumadau (Kulumadau Primary School), where 200 students are taught (60 coming from outer islands). Students must travel to Alotau on the mainland to attend secondary school. Kulumadau (along with Guasopa) was built in the post-colonial times, and as such, is not considered a traditional village of Woodlark, however, since its inception, Kulumadau has been the primary population center on Woodlark Island.

Kulumadau is located near the head of Kwaiapan Bay, 14 km (8.7 mi) north of the village of Bonagai and 18 km (11 mi) south of the village of Dikoias. Modern gold exploration was initiated in 1962 with the Bureau of Mineral Resources undertaking surface geochemistry, limited geophysics and diamond drilling during 1962 and 1963 at Kulumadau. Since 1990, Kulumadau has gained a medium-sized timber company (Milne Bay Logging) and a mining exploration camp (BHP).
