= 12th Antiaircraft Artillery Battalion =

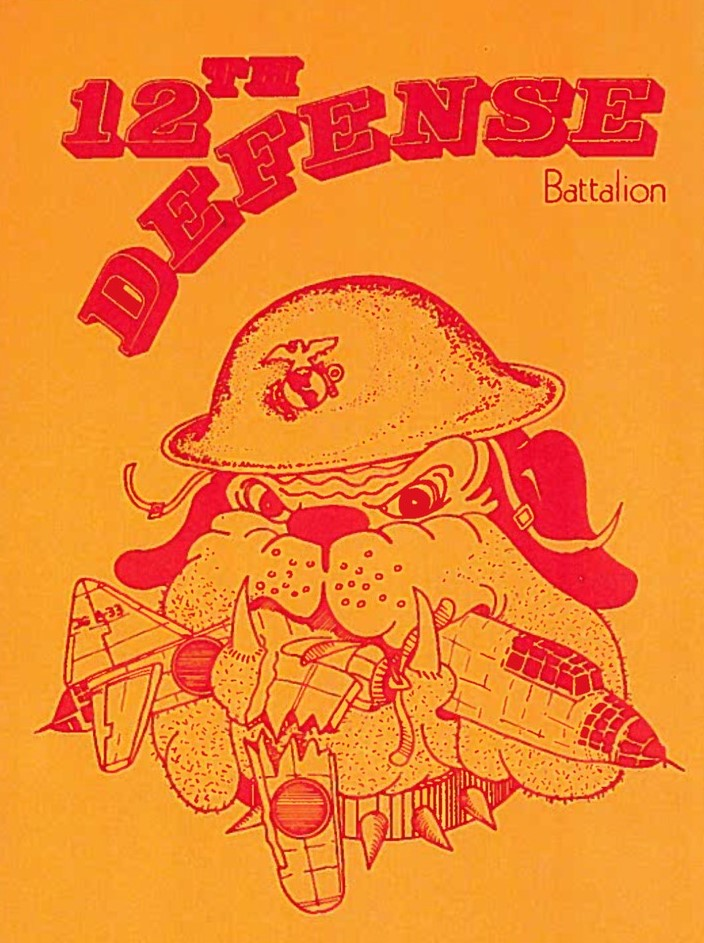
- Unofficial 12th Defense Battalion insignia from 1980 Reunion pamphlet
- Active: 1 Aug 1942 – 22 Sep 1945
- Country: United States of America
- Branch: United States Marine Corps
- Type: Air Defense/Coastal Defense
- Size: ~1000 men
- Part of: I Marine Amphibious Corps
- Engagements: World War II: Operation Chronicle; Battle of Cape Gloucester; Battle of Peleliu

Commanders
- Current commander: N/A
- Notable commanders: William H. Harrison (USMC)

The 12th Antiaircraft Artillery Battalion (12th AAA Bn) was a United States Marine Corps antiaircraft unit that served during World War II. Formed in 1942 as the 12th Defense Battalion, its original mission was providing air and coastal defense for advanced naval bases. During the war the battalion defended the Russell Islands and took part in combat operations at Woodlark Island, Cape Gloucester, and Peleliu. The battalion remained on Peleliu for the duration of the war and was finally decommissioned on Guam on 22 September 1945.

== History ==
The 12th Defense Battalion was commissioned on August 1, 1942, at San Diego, California. On January 19, 1943, the battalion embarked on the USS Pinkney and the SS Robin Wentley and sailed for the Territory of Hawaii. It arrived at Pearl Harbor on January 29 and immediately set up camp at and began training at Camp Catlin on Oahu.

The battalion sailed from Pearl Harbor on May 14, 1943, on board the SS Robin Wentley. They arrived at Townsville, Australia on 1 June however it was not there long. The 12th Defense Battalion departed Australia on 13 June en route to their objective area. Between 30 June and 1 July the battalion landed at Woodlark Island and Milne Bay. Their mission was to provide area air defense for the United States Army units tasked with seizing these islands. The battalion remained at Woodlark Island until December 7, 1943, when it set departed for Oro Bay, New Guinea.

The 12th Defense Battalion came ashore on Cape Gloucester between 26 & 27 December 1943. Once ashore the battalion was initially tasked with establishing air and seacoast defense of Beaches Yellow 1 & 2. As the battalion was unloading on 26 December the first Japanese air raids occurred. A few hastily placed guns let loose against 88 Japanese aircraft that were strafing and bombing the beachhead. With no real threat of an amphibious counterattack, the battalion's coastal guns were utilized for deep fired against Japanese supply ships and staging areas. The battalions radars and guns provided early warning and anti-aircraft fires against Japanese planes flying out of Rabaul that continued to harass the beachhead over the next few months.

A majority of the battalion departed Cape Gloucester via the SS Santa Monica on 1 June 1944. It arrived at Banika in the Russell Islands on 9 June. As the war progressed, the Marine Corps removed coastal artillery from the defense battalions in order to form additional heavy artillery units for the Fleet Marine Force. Because of the divestiture of the coastal defense mission, the battalion was re-designated as the 12th Antiaircraft Artillery Battalion on 15 June 1944.

At the end of August 1944 the battalion participated in landing rehearsals at Guadalcanal and on 8 September they set sail for Peleliu. The battalion went ashore at Peleliu on 15 September 1944 and, along with the 7th Antiaircraft Artillery Battalion was tasked with providing air defense for the landing force once ashore. The battalion guns were also utilized in direct fire mission in support of Marine assault forces attempting to dislodge dug in Japanese defenders. After the battle, the battalion remained on Peleliu for the duration of the war. In March 1945, the unit's heavy guns section was sent to the northern Palau Islands in order to engage enemy targets.

On 13 September 1945 the 12th AAA Battalion departed Peleliu arriving on Guam on 16 September. On 22 September 1945 the battalion was decommissioned on Guam.

== Unit awards ==
A unit citation or commendation is an award bestowed upon an organization for the action cited. Members of the unit who participated in said actions are allowed to wear on their uniforms the awarded unit citation. The 12th Antiaircraft Artillery Battalion has been presented with the following awards:

Streamer	Award	Year(s)	Additional Info
	Asiatic-Pacific Campaign Streamer w/ 3 Bronze Stars		Eastern New Guinea, New Britain, Peleliu
	World War II Victory Streamer	1941–1945	Pacific War

Memorial for the members of the 12th Defense Battalion lost during WW2. It is located inside the MCRD, San Diego, CA

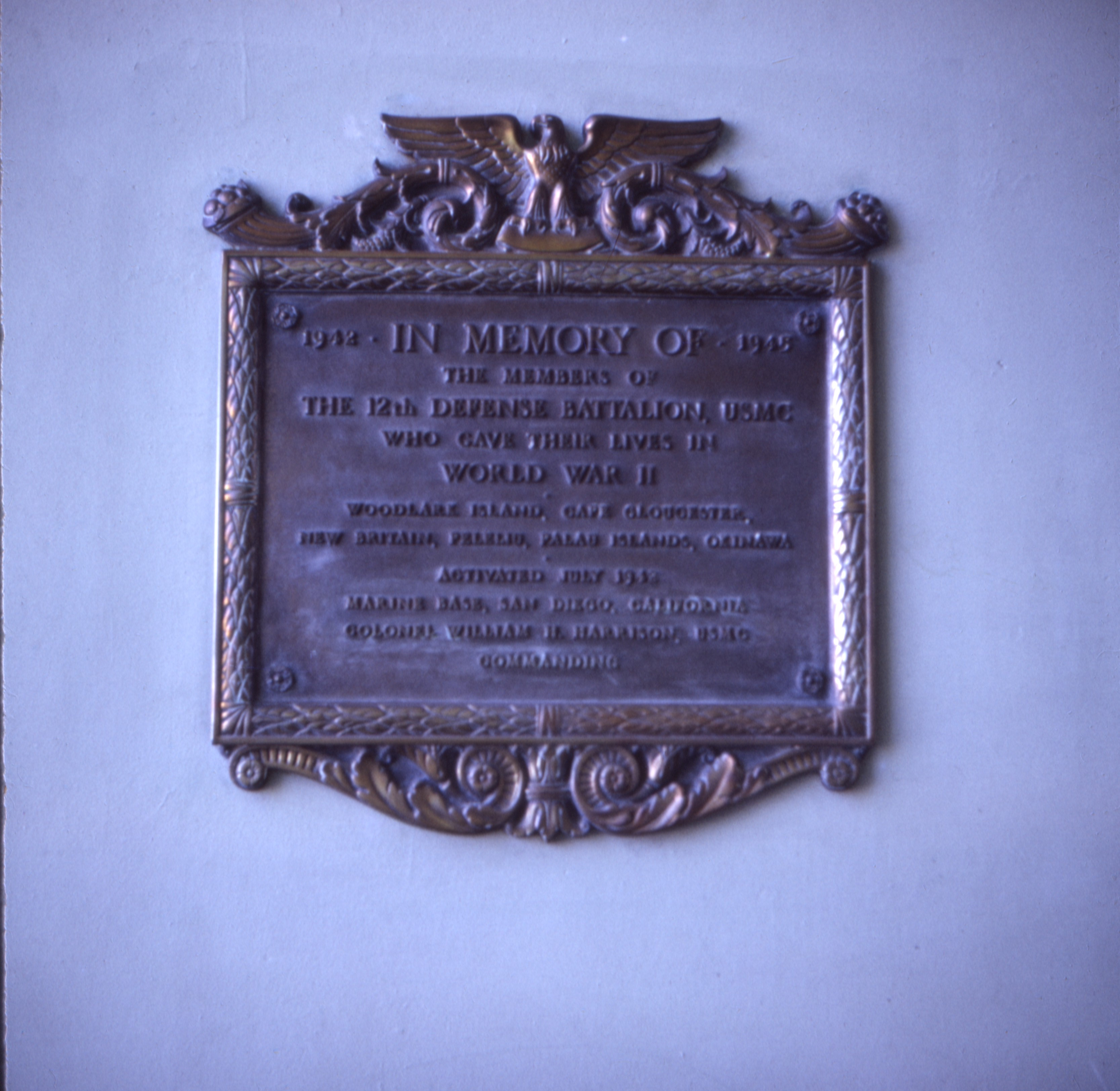

- Marine Defense Battalions
- List of United States Marine Corps aviation support units
