= Neargyria =

Scientific classification
- Domain: Eukaryota
- Kingdom: Animalia
- Phylum: Arthropoda
- Class: Insecta
- Order: Lepidoptera
- Family: Crambidae
- Subfamily: Crambinae
- Tribe: incertae sedis
- Genus: Neargyria; Hampson, 1896

Genus of moths

Neargyria is a genus of moths of the family Crambidae.

== Species ==
- Neargyria argyraspis (Meyrick, 1879)
- Neargyria persimilis Hampson, 1919
