= 11th Marine Regiment =

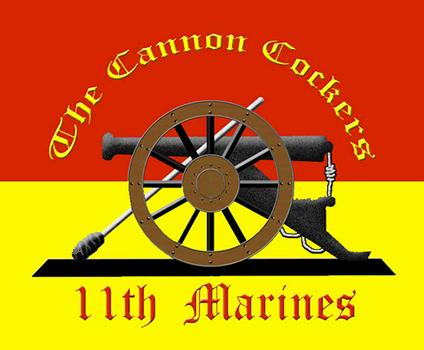
- 11th Marine Regiment Insignia
- Active: 3 January 1918 – 11 August 1919; 9 May 1927 – 31 July 1927; January 1928 – 31 August 1929; 1 March 1941 – present
- Country: United States of America
- Branch: United States Marine Corps
- Type: Artillery
- Role: Provide fires in support of 1st Marine Division
- Size: Regiment
- Part of: 1st Marine Division
- Garrison/HQ: Marine Corps Base Camp Pendleton Marine Corps Air Ground Combat Center Twentynine Palms
- Nickname: The Cannon Cockers
- Engagements: World War I; World War II; Guadalcanal campaign; Battle of Cape Gloucester; Mariana and Palau Islands campaign; Battle of Peleliu; Volcano and Ryukyu Islands campaign; Battle of Okinawa; Korean War; Battle of Incheon; Battle of Chosin Reservoir; Vietnam War; Operation Desert Storm; War on terror; Operation Iraqi Freedom; Operation Enduring Freedom; Operation Inherent Resolve

Commanders
- Current commander: Colonel Benjamin B. Harrison
- Notable commanders: Pedro del Valle; Robert H. Pepper; William H. Harrison; William T. Fairbourn; Lewis J. Fields; Carl A. Youngdale

The 11th Marine Regiment is an artillery regiment of the United States Marine Corps based at Marine Corps Base Camp Pendleton, California. Known as the "Cannon Cockers", the regiment falls under the command of the 1st Marine Division and the I Marine Expeditionary Force. Its primary weapon system is the M777A2 howitzer with a maximum effective range of 30 km, however the 5th Battalion has converted to fire the HIMARS (High Mobility Artillery Rocket System) weapon system.

== Organization ==
Headquarters Battery, 11th Marines (HQ 11th Marines)

- 1st Battalion, 11th Marines (1/11th Marines)
- 2nd Battalion, 11th Marines (2/11th Marines)
- 3rd Battalion, 11th Marines (3/11th Marines)
- Fire Support Battalion (activated on 19 December 2024)

Note: a "4th Battalion" of the 11th Marines was present in World War II, Korean War and Vietnam, while the 5th Battalion, 11th Marines was deactivated on 29 March 2024)

== History ==
=== Early years ===
The 11th Marine Regiment was activated during World War I on 3 January 1918. Originally planned as a light artillery regiment, it was converted to an infantry unit and went to France as part of the 5th Marine Expeditionary Brigade in the waning days of the war. It did not see combat, but served as base guard troops and returned home to be disbanded on 11 August 1919.

On 9 May 1927, another 11th Regiment was activated from troops in Haiti and at Quantico for service in Nicaragua of brief duration. The regimental headquarters was disbanded on 31 July 1927, and the two battalions in September. Renewed political problems in Nicaragua and the intensified guerrilla campaign of the bandit leader Augusto Sandino caused the activation of another 11th Regiment at Norfolk, Virginia, and San Diego, California, in January 1928. A third battalion was organized on the east coast on 21 March 1928. Again, service in Nicaragua was brief, with the third battalion being disbanded on 15 June 1929 and the remainder of the regiment on 31 August 1929.

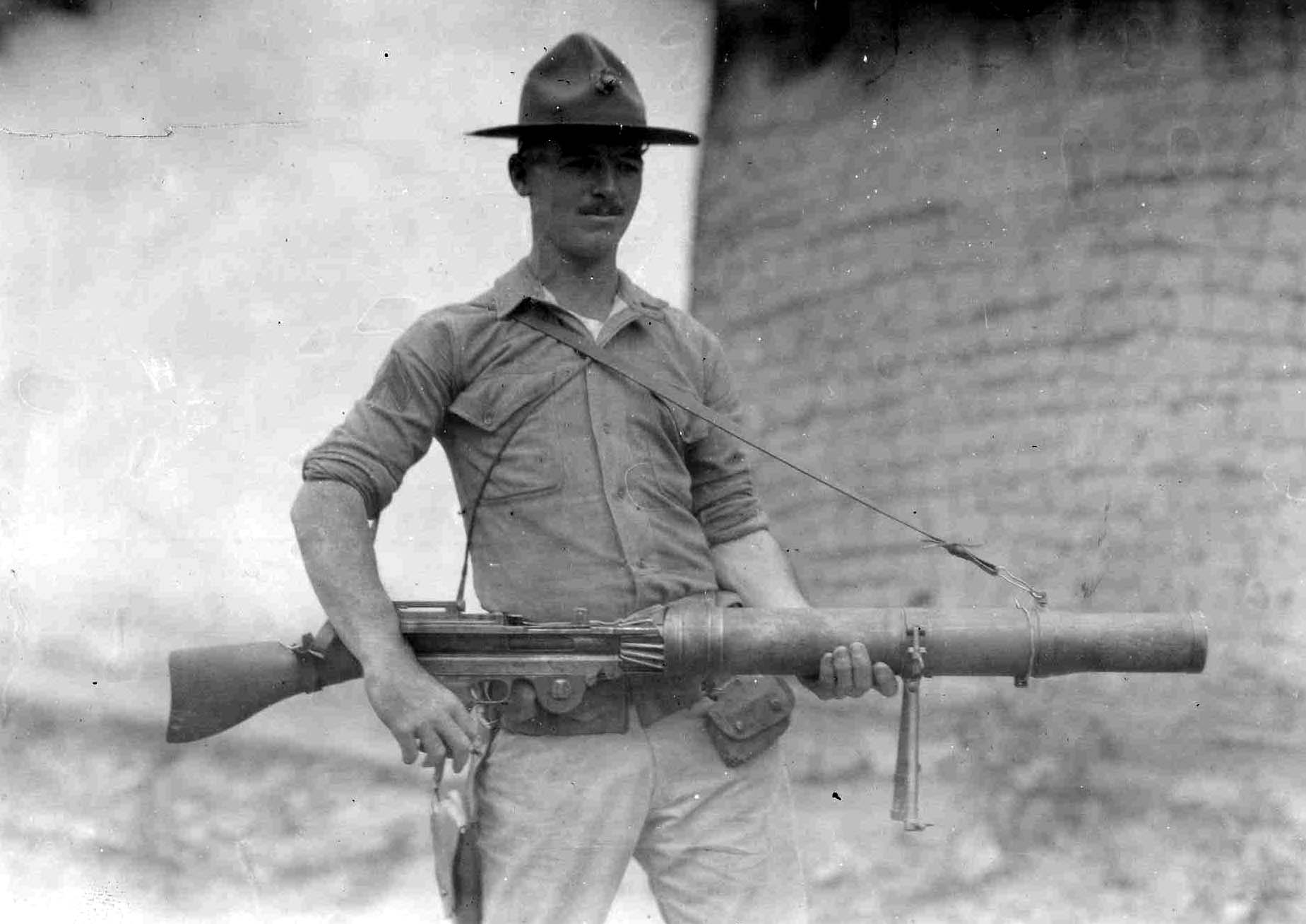
Lewis machine gun captured from bandits at El Chufon by the 52d Co., 11th Regt on 19 Oct 1928 in Nicaragua.

=== World War II ===
With the approach of World War II and the consequent expansion of the Marine Corps, an 11th Marines (Artillery) was activated at Guantanamo Bay, Cuba, on 1 March 1941. Activation of the regiment's organic battalions already had been underway since 1 September 1940 when the 1st Battalion was created. After its return to the United States from Cuba, the regiment (less the 1st Battalion) shipped overseas with the 1st Marine Division to New Zealand in June–July 1942. The 1st Battalion went to Samoa with the 7th Marine Regiment in March 1942. Together they formed the 3rd Marine Brigade until they were sent to Guadalcanal that fall.

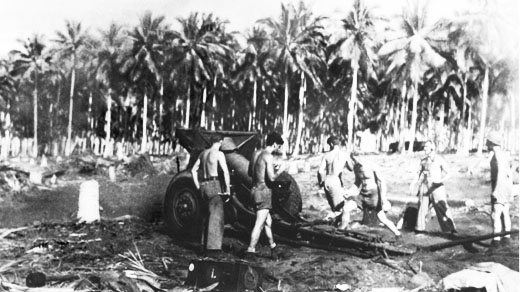
11th Marines cannoneers man a M1918 155 mm howitzer during the Guadalcanal campaign.

The 11th Marines participated in the Battle of Guadalcanal in August with the 1st Marine Division and played an especially significant part in the Battle of the Tenaru and the Battle of Bloody Ridge. The 1st Battalion rejoined the regiment in September on Guadalcanal. On 15 December 1942, the 11th Marines left Guadalcanal for Australia, rested and reorganized, and then reentered combat on New Britain at Cape Gloucester on 26 December 1943. Here the regiment furnished support to the infantry in their capture of the Japanese aerodrome. Following the New Britain campaign came a period of preparation for the Peleliu landing where the regiment was actively engaged.

For the first two weeks after the initial landing on 15 September 1944, the regiment took part in the Battle of Peleliu under Colonel William H. Harrison. All artillery support was handled both novelly and conventionally, providing massed preparatory, harassing, and interdicting fire. Later, the artillery was used to fire directly into the mouths of enemy caves. In March 1945, the 11th Marines participated in the Battle of Okinawa, its final combat operation of World War II. There the regiment played an important defensive role with effective counter-battery fire, and steadily suppressed enemy attempts to counter-attack objectives already won by U.S. forces. With the war won, in the fall of 1945 the 11th Marines moved to Tianjin in North China as an element of Operation Beleaguer. There it was soon involved in trying to keep peace in the midst of the increasing conflict between rival Chinese factions. Early in 1947, the regiment returned to the United States to be reduced virtually to a battalion-sized unit.

=== Korean War ===
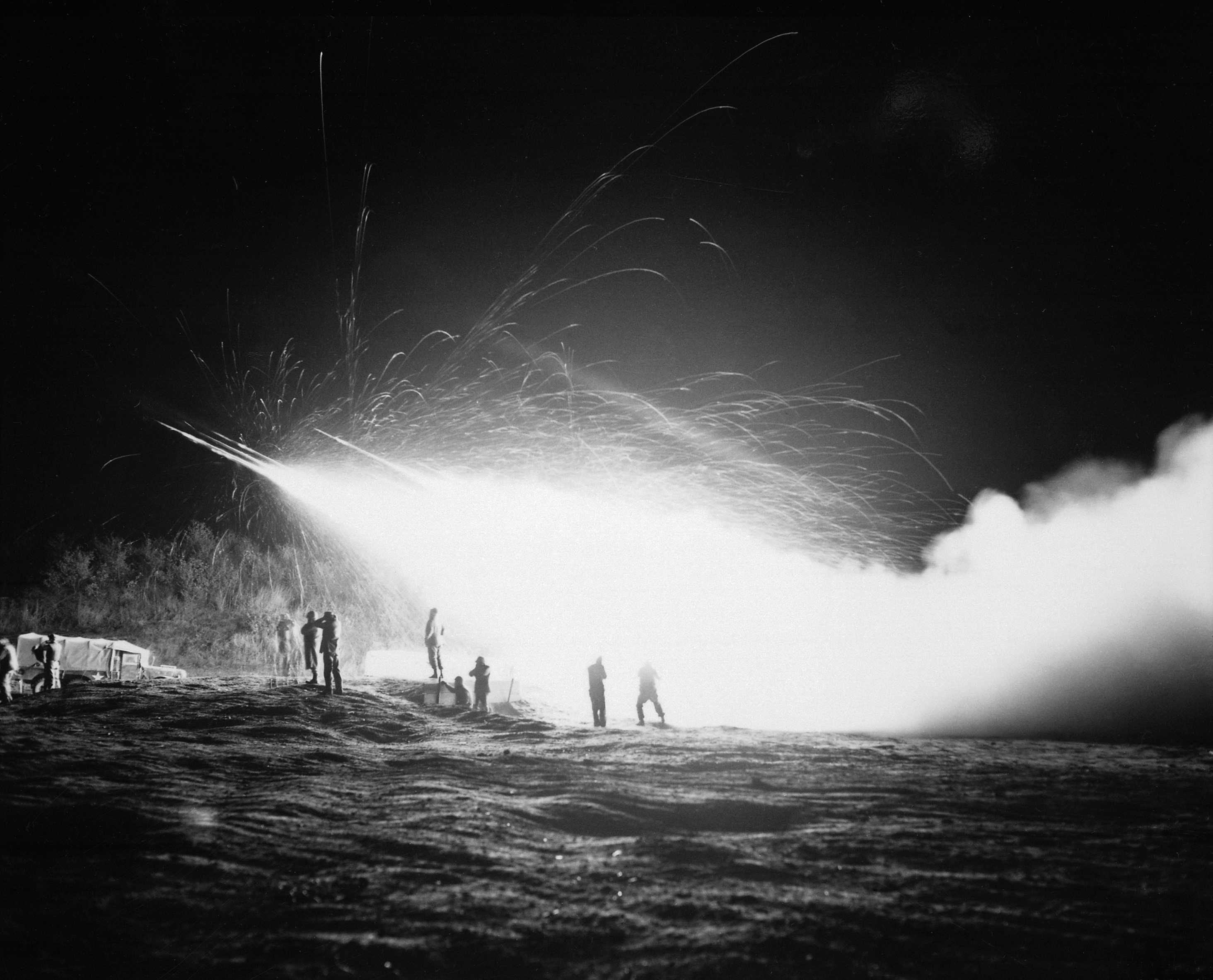
11th Marine Regiment's First Rocket Battery firing at night during the Korean War

Three years later North Korea invaded South Korea, and the 1st Battalion was part of the 1st Provisional Marine Brigade deployed in August 1950 to the Pusan Perimeter to help stem their advance. Other battalions were organized in the United States and were available for service when the 1st Marine Division made the Incheon landing. Shifted back to the east coast of Korea, the battalions were attached to regimental combat teams and participated in the Battle of Chosin Reservoir.

One of the more famous engagements of the regiment during the Korean War came on 7 December 1950 during the breakout from the Chosin Reservoir. George and How Batteries of 2nd Battalion were halted along the main road by heavy machine gun fire. The ensuing fight would pit two artillery batteries against a battalion of Chinese infantry in broad daylight and at close range. The guns were laid level due to the proximity of the Chinese forces and the Marines braced their bodies against the guns because there was no time to dig them in. When it was over the Marines counted over 500 enemy dead on the field and had expended over 600 rounds of ammunition. One Marine officer was quoted at the time as saying, "Has field artillery ever had a grander hour?"

The 11th Marines participated in continued heavy action on the East Central Front throughout 1951, (such as the Battle of the Punchbowl) and in March 1952, moved to the Western Front, (Battle of Bunker Hill near Panmunjom). The 11th was finally able to sail from Korea for the United States and Camp Pendleton on 7 March 1955.

=== Vietnam War ===
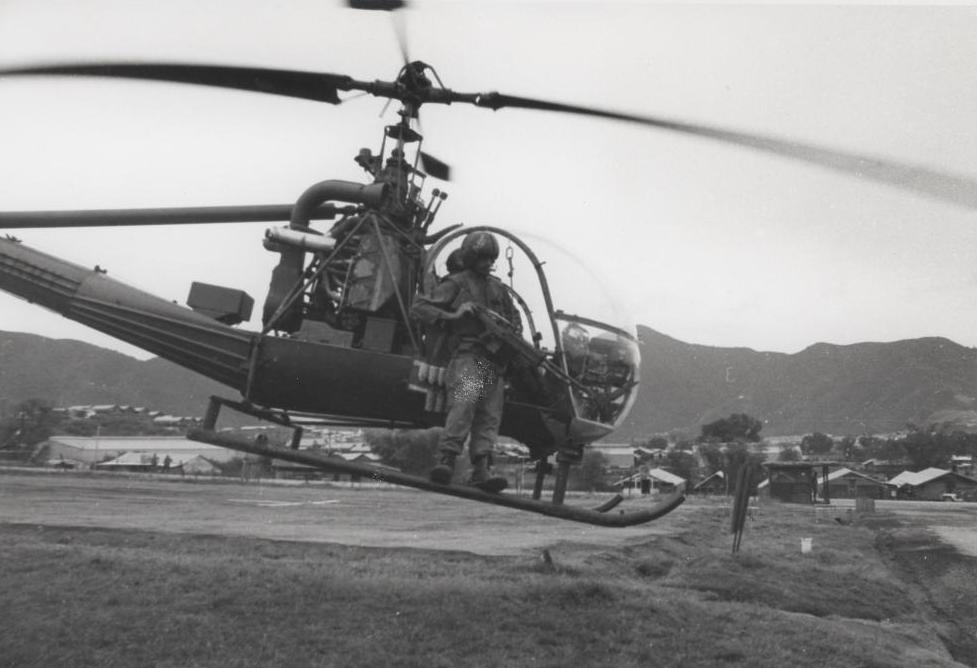
11th Marines OH-23 light observation helicopter, 6 August 1968

The years between 1955 and 1965 were spent in continued training to maintain a constant state of readiness. During the Cuban Missile Crisis of October 1962, the 11th Marines played a role in the task force ordered to impose a naval quarantine against arms shipments to Cuba.

A new era opened on 8 March 1965 when the Marines were committed to ground action in South Vietnam. Beginning on 16 August 1965, the regiment was gradually deployed to South Vietnam. The transfer was completed by the arrival of the 2d Battalion on 27 May 1966. The nature of the war required the artillerymen to defend their own positions against numerous enemy probes and brought about a vastly increased employment of artillery by helicopters, both for displacement and resupply.

The regimental history in Vietnam was characterized by fighting as detachments in dispersed areas. Hastings, Hue City, Napoleon/Saline II, Mameluke Thrust, Oklahoma Hills, Pipestone Canyon and Imperial Lake were some of the more significant operations in which the regiment participated. Redeployment to the United States started in October 1970. The 1st Battalion was the last unit of the regiment to depart for the United States and Camp Pendleton in May 1971.

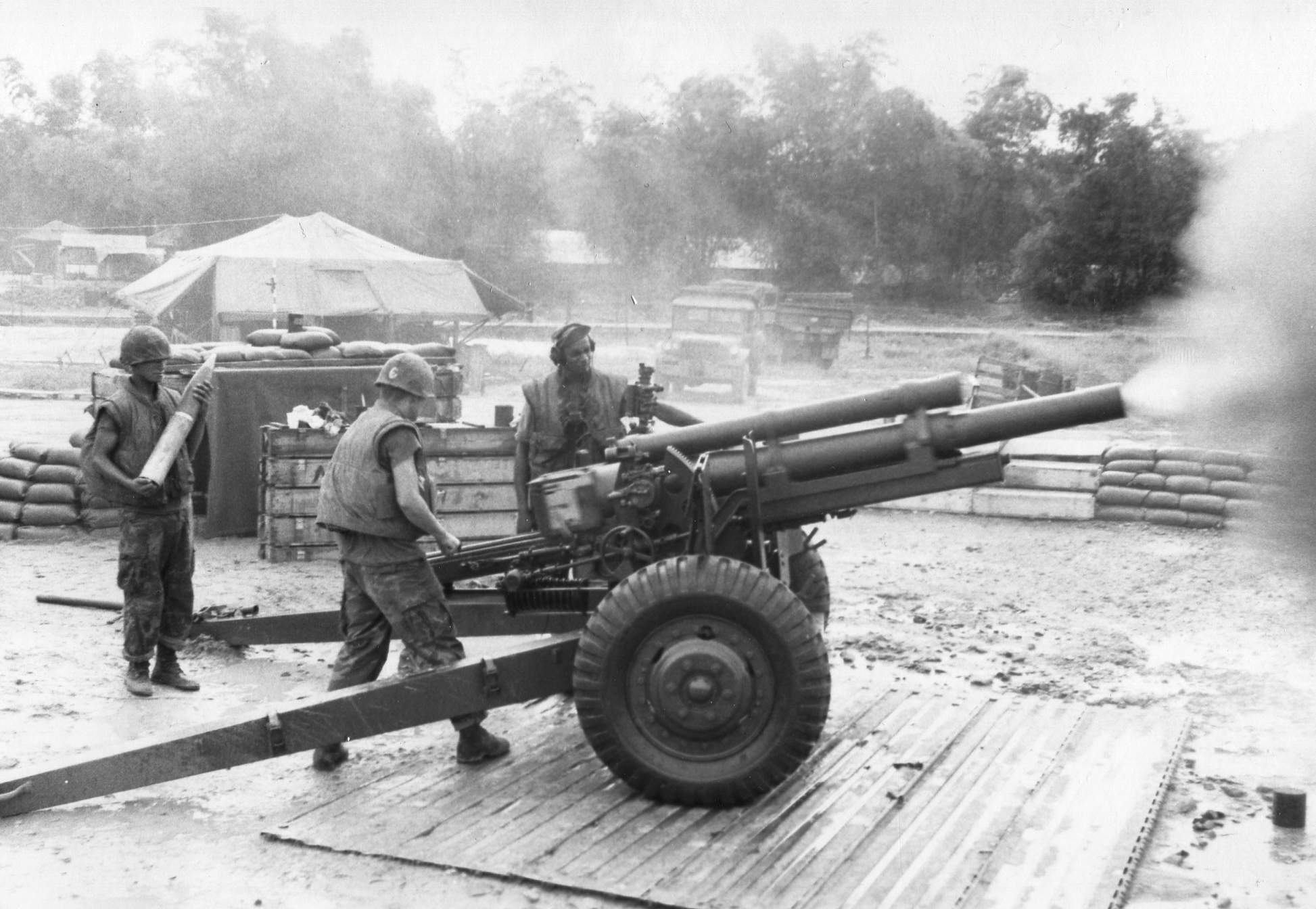
11th Marines 105mm howitzer firing in support of joint Marine and ARVN forces in enemy-infested Dodge City and Go Noi Island

During the next decade, the 11th Marines experienced a high level of activity, participating in many training and support exercises. In 1975 the regiment provided support for Operation New Arrivals and the Vietnamese refugees. The 11th Marines participated in numerous training exercises throughout the 1980s to maintain the regiments high level of operational readiness.

=== The Gulf War and the 1990s ===
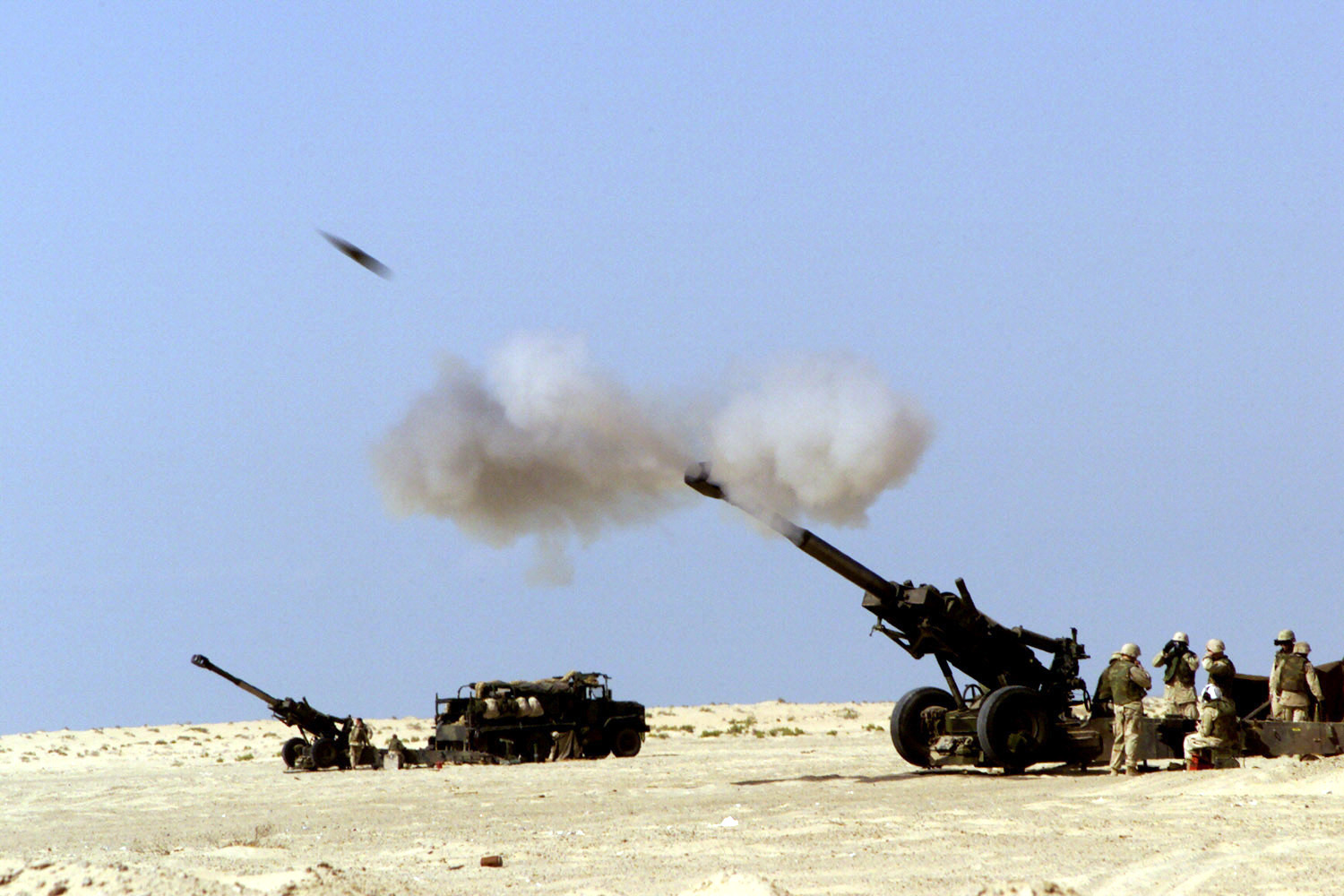
A 155mm artillery shell hurtles out of the barrel of an 11th Marine Regiment M-198 howitzer

The regiment's ability to respond quickly to a crisis was put to the test in August 1990, when Iraq invaded and occupied its neighbor, Kuwait. President George H. W. Bush immediately ordered American forces, including Marines, to the Persian Gulf, to deter a possible Iraqi assault into Saudi Arabia. Elements of the 11th Marines began departing Camp Pendleton on 25 August as part of the 7th Marine Expeditionary Brigade, en route to Saudi Arabia and Operation Desert Shield. Early in September, 7th MEB was absorbed by I Marine Expeditionary Force. The mission of the 11th Marines was to provide effective artillery support to the various task forces comprising the 1st Marine Division. Upon arrival in Saudi Arabia, the regiment began an intensive training program, which included liaison with the famous British "Desert Rats," the 40th Field Regiment Royal Artillery.

Operation Desert Storm began early on 17 January 1991, and the 11th Marines fired its first artillery mission against Iraqi forces, when elements of the regiment conducted an early morning surface artillery raid just south of Khafji. This was the first in a series of 11th Marines artillery raids conducted along the Saudi Arabian/Kuwaiti border, both on the Persian Gulf coast and along the south-west border area near several oil fields. As the major coalition ground offensive began on 24 February, the 11th Marines was already inside Kuwait providing vital fire support to Task Forces Grizzly and Taro. Throughout Operation Desert Storm, the 11th Marines provided close and continuous fire support to the 1st Marine Division.

Upon 28 February 1991 ceasefire which ended the fighting, the 11th Marines prepared to leave the Persian Gulf for home. The regiment's seven-month deployment and the Gulf War came to an end on 5 April with a much-deserved welcome at Camp Pendleton, California.

Throughout the remaining years of the decade, elements of the 11th Marines participated in Operation Sea Angel in Bangladesh and in Operation Restore Hope in Somalia. The regiment also assisted in fire-fighting efforts in the western United States during the summer of 1994.

=== Global war on terrorism ===
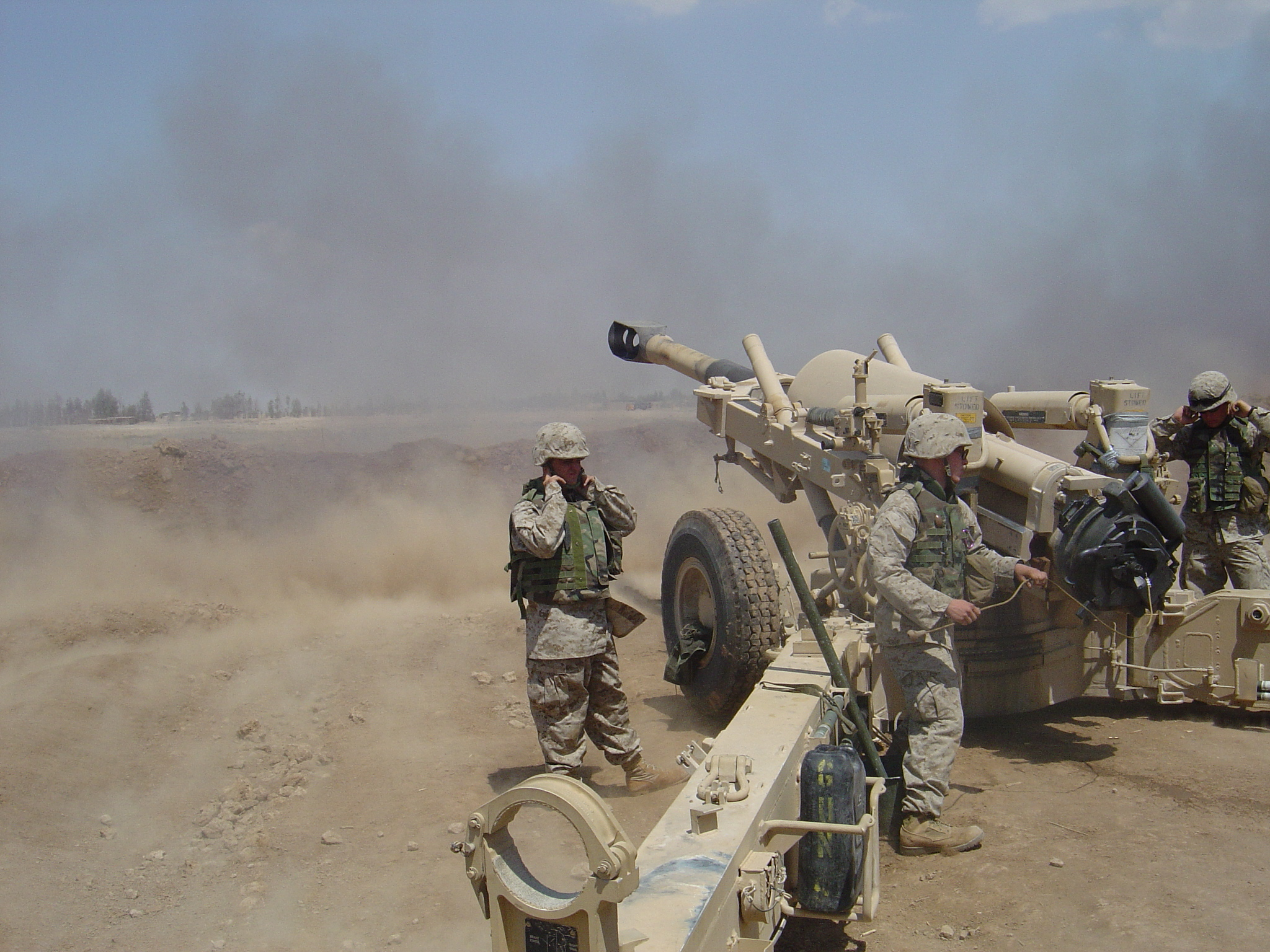
Marines from A/1/11 firing their M198 Howitzer from Camp Fallujah, Iraq during Operation Vigilant Resolve in April 2004.

The terrorist attacks on 11 September 2001 marked the start of the global war on terror. The Cannon Cockers were ready when the order was given to deploy. Beginning in 2003, the 11th Marine Regiment actively participated in Operations Enduring Freedom and Iraqi Freedom. This included deploying as a regiment to Kuwait and Iraq in January–May 2003. From 2004 to 2009, elements from the Regiment deployed in support of all major contingency operations in Iraq and Afghanistan. In 2009, the world's focus shifted towards the Afghanistan area of operations. From 2009 to present day, Cannon Cocker batteries have supported Operation Enduring Freedom without any lapse in coverage. Most recently, elements of the 11th Marine Regiment participated in the fight against the Islamic State in Syria as a part of Operation Inherent Resolve.

The Commanding Officer of 11th Marines is Colonel Benjamin B. Harrison.

== Unit awards ==
A unit citation or commendation is an award bestowed upon an organization for the action cited. Members of the unit who participated in said actions are allowed to wear on their uniforms the appropriate ribbon of the awarded unit citation. 11th Marine Regiment has been awarded the following:

| Streamer | Award | Year(s) | Additional Info |
|---|---|---|---|
| | Presidential Unit Citation Streamer with one silver and four bronze stars | 1942, 1944, 1945, 1950, 1951, 1966–1967, 1967–1968, 1968, 2003 | Guadalcanal, Peleliu, Okinawa, Korea, Vietnam, Iraq (OIF) |
| | Navy Unit Commendation Streamer with two bronze stars | 1943–1944, 1953, 1990–1991 | New Britain, Korea, Iraq (Desert Shield/Desert Storm) |
| | Meritorious Unit Commendation with one bronze star | 1968, 1994 | Vietnam, Western US (Taskforce Wildfire) |
| | World War I Victory Streamer with bronze Maltese Cross | 1918 | France |
| | Second Nicaraguan Campaign Streamer | 1927, 1928–1929 | Nicaragua |
| | American Defense Service Streamer with one star | 1941 | Cuba |
| | Asiatic-Pacific Campaign Streamer with one silver and one bronze star | 1942, 1942–1943, 1943, 1943–1944, 1944, 1945 | Guadalcanal – Tulagi Landings, Capture and defense of Guadalcanal, New Guinea, New Britain, Capture and Occupation of Palau Islands, Assault and Occupation of Okinawa |
| | World War II Victory Streamer | 1941–1945 | Pacific War |
| | Navy Occupation Service Streamer with Asia Clasp | 1945 | Okinawa |
| | China Service Streamer | 1945–1947 | North China |
| | National Defense Service Streamer with three stars | 1950–1954, 1961–1974, 1990–1995, 2001–2022 | United States |
| | Korean Service Streamer with two silver stars | 1950, 1950, 1950–1951, 1951, 1951, 1951, 1951–1952, 1952, 1952–1953, 1953 | North Korean Aggression, Inchon Landing, Communist Chinese Aggression, First UN Counteroffensive, Communist China Spring Offensive, UN Summer-Fall Offensive, Second Korean Winter, Korean Defense Summer-Fall 1952, Third Korean Winter, Korea Summer-Fall 1953 |
| | Armed Forces Expeditionary Streamer | 1962 | Cuba (Cuban Missile Crisis) |
| | Vietnam Service Streamer with two silver and two bronze stars | 1966, 1966–1967, 1967–1968, 1968, 1968, 1968, 1968–1969, 1969, 1969, 1969–1970, 1970, 1970–1971 | Vietnamese Counteroffensive Campaign, Phase II, Phase III, Tet Offensive, Vietnamese Counteroffensive Phase IV, Phase V, Phase VI, Tet 60/Counteroffensive, Vietnam Summer-Fall 1969, Sanctuary Counteroffensive, Vietnam Counteroffensive Phase VIII |
| | Southwest Asia Service Streamer with two bronze stars | 1990–1991, 1991 | Iraq (Desert Shield/Desert Storm) |
| | Afghanistan Campaign Streamer with one bronze star | 2009–2014 | Afghanistan (Elements) |
| | Iraq Campaign Streamer with two bronze stars | 2004–2009 | Iraq (Elements) |
| | Global War on Terrorism Expeditionary Streamer | 2003 | Iraq |
| | Global War on Terrorism Service Streamer | 2001–present | United States |
| | Republic of Korea Presidential Unit Citation Streamer | 1950, 1950, 1953 | Korea |
| | Vietnam Gallantry Cross with Palm Streamer | 1961–1969 | Vietnam |
| | Vietnam Meritorious Unit Citation Civil Actions Streamer | 1969–1971 | Vietnam |

== See also ==
- List of United States Marine Corps regiments
- Organization of the United States Marine Corps
