= Nanon Island =

Island in Papua New Guinea

Nanon
- Location within Papua New Guinea

Geography
- Location: Melanesia
- Coordinates: 9°3′44″S 152°25′17.7″E
- Archipelago: Woodlark Islands
- Adjacent to: Solomon Sea
- Highest elevation: 17 m (56 ft)

Administration
- Papua New Guinea
- Province: Milne Bay Province

Nanon is an island in Papua New Guinea located in Milne Bay. It is situated 6 km (4 miles) south of Nusam island.
