= Kudul Point =

Headland in Papua New Guinea

- Location within Papua New Guinea

Geography
- Location: Melanesia
- Coordinates: 9°2′27″S 152°28′19″E
- Archipelago: Solomon Islands
- Adjacent to: Solomon Sea
- Highest elevation: 12 m (39 ft)

Administration
- Papua New Guinea
- Province: Milne Bay Province
- Capital city: Port Moresby
- Largest settlement: Port Moresby
- Prime Minister: Peter O'Neill

Kudal Point is a point in Papua New Guinea located in Milne Bay. It is situated 6 km (4 miles) north of Boagis.
