= Nubara =

Island in Papua New Guinea

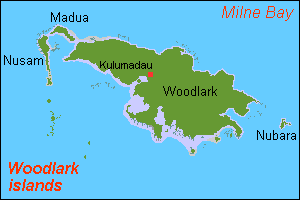

- Location within Papua New Guinea

Geography
- Location: Oceania
- Coordinates: 9°16′S 153°05′E
- Archipelago: Woodlark Islands
- Area: 0.7 km^{2} (0.27 sq mi)
- Highest elevation: 17 m (56 ft)

Administration
- Papua New Guinea
- Province: Milne Bay Province

Nubara is an island in Papua New Guinea. It is located in the east of the country, in the Milne Bay Province, about 700 km to the east of the Port Moresby.

== Geography ==
The land of Nubara Island is flat. The highest point on the island is 17 meters above sea level. Island stretches about 1.3 km from the north to the south and 1.5 km from the east to the west. In total island covers about 0.70 square kilometers.
