= Neargyria argyraspis =

Scientific classification
- Kingdom: Animalia
- Phylum: Arthropoda
- Class: Insecta
- Order: Lepidoptera
- Family: Crambidae
- Subfamily: Crambinae
- Tribe: incertae sedis
- Genus: Neargyria
- Species: N. argyraspis

Binomial name
- Neargyria argyraspis (Meyrick, 1879)

Synonyms
- Argyria argyraspis Meyrick, 1879

Species of moth

Neargyria argyraspis is a moth in the family Crambidae. It was described by Edward Meyrick in 1879. It is found in Australia, where it has been recorded from Queensland and New South Wales.
