= USS LST-454 =

1942 LST-1-class tank landing ship

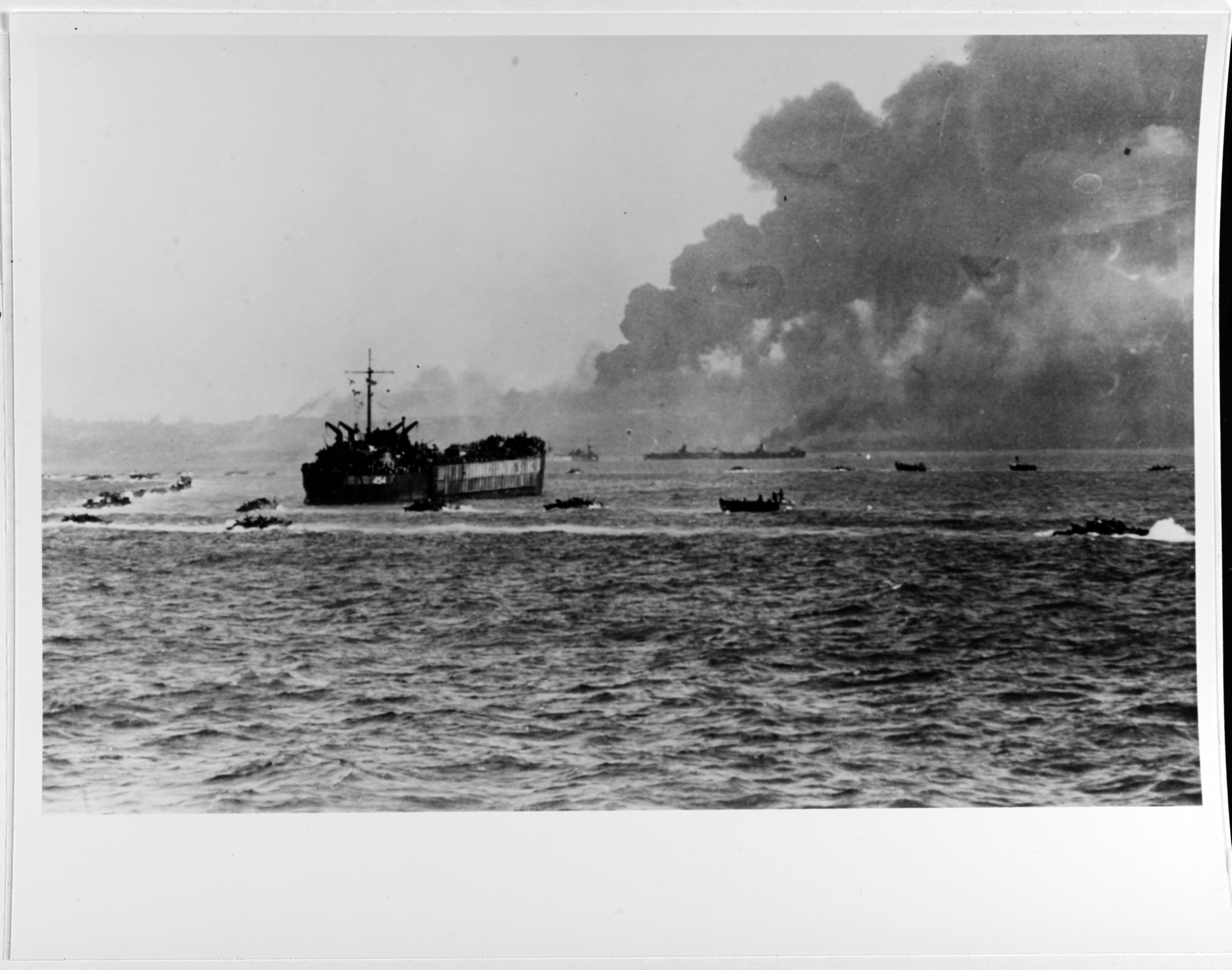
- USS LST-454, during a World War II amphibious landing, 1944-45.

History

United States
- Name: LST-454
- Ordered: as a Type S3-M-K2 hull, MCE hull 974
- Builder: Kaiser Shipbuilding Company, Vancouver, Washington
- Yard number: 158
- Laid down: 31 July 1942
- Launched: 14 October 1942
- Commissioned: 26 January 1943
- Decommissioned: 25 March 1946
- Stricken: 1 May 1946
- Identification: Hull symbol: LST-454; Code letters: NFGS
- Honors and awards: 8 × battle stars
- Fate: Sold for scrapping, 3 October 1947

General characteristics
- Class & type: LST-1-class tank landing ship
- Displacement: 4,080 long tons (4,145 t) full load; 2,160 long tons (2,190 t) landing
- Length: 328 ft (100 m) oa
- Beam: 50 ft (15 m)
- Draft: Full load: 8 ft 2 in (2.49 m) forward; 14 ft 1 in (4.29 m) aft; Landing at 2,160 t: 3 ft 11 in (1.19 m) forward; 9 ft 10 in (3.00 m) aft
- Installed power: 2 × 900 hp (670 kW) Electro-Motive Diesel 12-567A diesel engines; 1,700 shp (1,300 kW)
- Propulsion: 1 × Falk main reduction gears; 2 × Propellers
- Speed: 12 kn (22 km/h; 14 mph)
- Range: 24,000 nmi (44,000 km; 28,000 mi) at 9 kn (17 km/h; 10 mph) while displacing 3,960 long tons (4,024 t)
- Boats & landing craft carried: 2 or 6 x LCVPs
- Capacity: 2,100 tons oceangoing maximum; 350 tons main deckload
- Troops: 16 officers, 147 enlisted men
- Complement: 13 officers, 104 enlisted men
- Armament: Varied, ultimate armament; 2 × twin 40 mm (1.57 in) Bofors guns; 4 × single 40 mm Bofors guns; 12 × 20 mm (0.79 in) Oerlikon cannons

Service record
- Operations: Eastern New Guinea operation; Lae occupation (4–5 September 1943); Finschhafen occupation (22–23 September 1943); Saidor occupation (2–3 and 6–9 January 1944); Bismarck Archipelago operation; Admiralty Islands landings (11–15 March 1944); Hollandia operation (21–26 April 1944); Western New Guinea operation; Biak Islands operation (28–31 May and 3–7 and 12–16 June 1944); Morotai landing (15 September 1944); Leyte landings (23 October–4 November and 10–29 November 1944); Lingayen Gulf landings (4–18 January 1945); Visayan Island landings (26 March, 2–4 and 9–10 April 1945); Balikpapan operation (26 June–4 July 1945)
- Awards: American Campaign Medal; Asiatic–Pacific Campaign Medal; World War II Victory Medal; Philippine Republic Presidential Unit Citation; Philippine Liberation Medal

USS LST-454 was a United States Navy LST-1-class tank landing ship used in the Asiatic-Pacific Theater during World War II.

== Construction ==
LST-454 was laid down on 31 July 1942, under Maritime Commission (MARCOM) contract, MC hull 974, by Kaiser Shipyards, Vancouver, Washington; launched on 14 October 1942; and commissioned on 26 January 1943.

== Service history ==
During the war, LST-454 was assigned to the Pacific Theater of Operations. She took part in the Eastern New Guinea operations, the Lae occupation in September 1943, the Finschhafen occupation in September 1943, and the Saidor occupation in January 1944; the Admiralty Islands landings in February and March 1944; the Hollandia operation in April 1944; the Western New Guinea operations, the Biak Islands operation in May and June 1944, and the Morotai landing in September 1944; the Leyte landings in October and November 1944; the Lingayen Gulf landings in January 1945; the Visayan Island landings in March and April 1945; and the Balikpapan operation in June and July 1945.

== Post-war service ==
Following the war, LST-454 returned to the United States and was decommissioned on 25 March 1946, and struck from the Navy list on 1 May, that same year. On 3 October 1947, the ship was sold to the Patapsco Scrap Corp., of Baltimore, Maryland, and subsequently scrapped.

== Honors and awards ==
LST-454 earned eight battle stars for her World War II service.

== Notes ==
Citations

== Bibliography ==
Online resources

- "LST-454". Dictionary of American Naval Fighting Ships. Naval History and Heritage Command. This article incorporates text from this source, which is in the public domain.
- "Kaiser Vancouver, Vancouver WA". www.ShipbuildingHistory.com. 27 November 2010.
- "USS LST-454". NavSource. 10 October 2014.
