= Guasopa =

- Location within Papua New Guinea

Geography
- Location: Woodlark Island
- Coordinates: 9°13′S 152°57′E

Administration
- Papua New Guinea
- Province: Milne Bay Province

Guasopa is a village on Woodlark Island, Milne Bay Province Papua New Guinea. It is served by Guasopa Airport. Its population during the 1990 census was 170, though it has since grown extensively. Guasopa is the location of the Guasopa Health Center; this health center serves as the regional health care center, and has a team of nine health workers who service the population of around 6,000 people on Woodlark Island. This team also provide support for the other aid posts on the island and carry out patrols to surrounding islands. There is one school in Guasopa (the Gusaopa Community School), though most students in the area go to Kulumadau Primary School. Students must travel to Alotau on the mainland to attend secondary school.

From 1943 to 1945 the US operated Naval Base Woodlark Island at Guasopa.
