= Guasopa Airport =

Airport in Milne Bay, Papua New Guinea

- IATA: GAZ; ICAO: AYGJ

Summary
- Serves: Guasopa, Woodlark Island
- Coordinates: 9°14′00″S 152°57′00″E

Map

Guasopa Airport (IATA: GAZ, ICAO: AYGJ), is an airport at Guasopa on Woodlark Island, in the Milne Bay Province, Papua New Guinea.

== History ==
=== World War II ===
U.S. forces captured Woodlark Island on 30 June 1943 as part of Operation Chronicle. The 60th US Naval Construction Battalion began construction on 2 July of a 3,000 by 150 feet (914 by 46 m) coral‑surfaced runway which was ready for use by 14 July. The runway was later expanded and by September measured 6,500 by 225 feet (1,981 by 69 m) and by October 12 a parallel 6,000 by 60 feet (1,829 by 18 m) runway was also built, together with 110 hardstands. The airfield was also known as Woodlark Airfield. The airfield was used as a stopover point and refuelling point.

RAAF:

- No. 78 Squadron RAAF P-40s

USAAF:

- 39th Fighter Squadron operating P-39s
- 67th Fighter Squadron operating P-39s

== See also ==
- Naval Base Woodlark Island
