= Boagis Island =

Island in Papua New Guinea

Boagis
- Location within Papua New Guinea

Geography
- Location: Melanesia
- Coordinates: 9°3′44″S 152°25′17.7″E
- Archipelago: Woodlark Islands
- Adjacent to: Solomon Sea
- Highest elevation: 17 m (56 ft)

Administration
- Papua New Guinea
- Province: Milne Bay Province

Boagis Island is an island in Papua New Guinea located in Milne Bay. It is situated 4 km (2 miles) north of Nusam island.
