= Woodlark Island =

Island in Papua New Guinea

Woodlark
Native name: Muyua, Muyuw
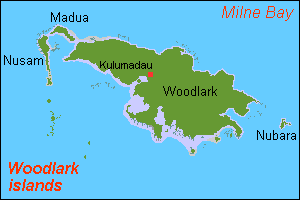
- Woodlark Islands

- Location within Papua New Guinea

Geography
- Location: Solomon Sea
- Coordinates: 9°7′35″S 152°48′20″E
- Highest elevation: 240 m (790 ft)
- Highest point: Mount Kabat

Administration
- Papua New Guinea
- Province: Milne Bay Province
- Largest settlement: Kulumadau (pop. 242 in 1990 (est. 2,500 in 2010 by unofficial census))

Demographics
- Population: ~1,700 (est. 6,000 in 2010 by unofficial census) (1990)

Woodlark Island, known to its inhabitants simply as Woodlark or Muyua, is the main island of the Woodlark Islands archipelago, located in Milne Bay Province and the Solomon Sea, Papua New Guinea.

Although no formal census has been conducted since 1990, the current population is estimated at approximately 6,000 people (see section below on Population Issues). There is one primary school on the island (in Kulumadau) that teaches about 200 students (60 students are from outer islands); to attend high school/secondary school, all children must travel to Alotau on the mainland.

== Etymology ==
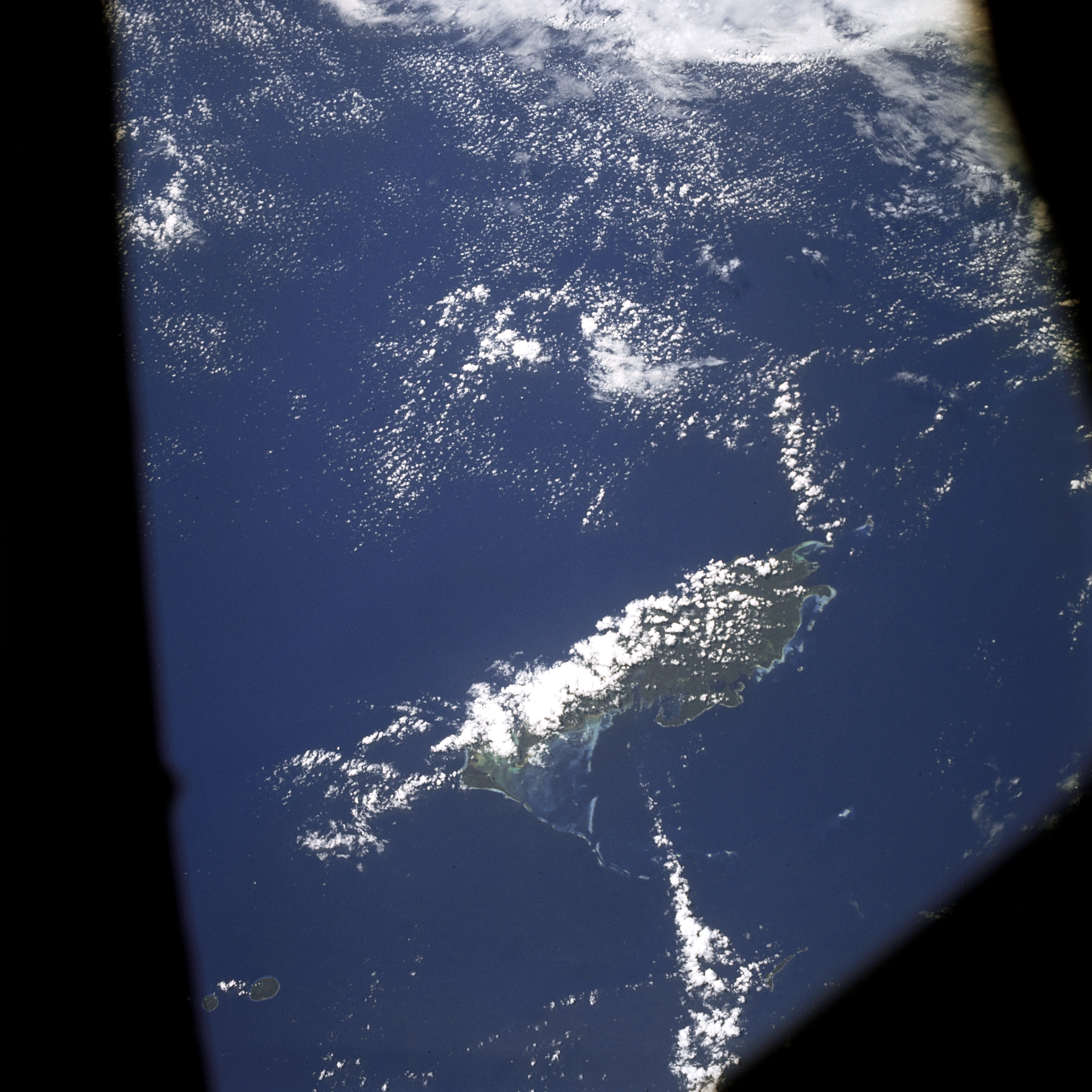
AS07-04-1609 (21 Oct. 1968) --- Woodlark Island in the Solomon Sea, east of New Guinea and northeast of Australia, as seen from the Apollo 7 spacecraft during its 158th revolution of Earth. Photographed from an altitude of 140 nautical miles, at ground elapsed time of 251 hours and 21 minutes.

Woodlark Island is also called Woodlark or Woodlarks by English language speakers. It is called Murua by the inhabitants of some other islands in the province.

== History ==
The quarry at Tubukuia mountain was important source of stone for Suloga axes, that were important trade objects used up to Gulf of Papua in the west.

The Australian whaling ship Woodlark (Captain George Grimes) called in the 1830s and the report of that visit led to Woodlark's name being attached to the island. Other whaling ships visited for water and wood in the decades that followed and islanders sometimes served as crewmen on those vessels. In 1841, the surviving crew of the Whaler Mary, having been wrecked on the nearby Lachlan Islands, sailed to Woodlark, and there all but one were murdered. The last recorded whaling ship to call was the American vessel Adeline Gibbs in October 1873.

An Italian missionary order of Roman Catholic clergy, the Pontifical Institute for Foreign Missions (P.I.M.E.), sent five priests and two brothers to Woodlark Island in 1852. Giovanni Battista (John) Mazzucconi was killed there in 1855 by an islander called Avicoar who opposed the missionaries and their religion.

Richard Ede and Charles Lobb, who had a trading post on the nearby Laughlan (Nada) Islands, discovered gold on the island in 1895. News of the find sparked off a gold-rush from Australia. By early 1897, steamers were arriving with gold seekers from Queensland every fortnight. In 1896–97, there were 400 white miners and 1,600 Papuan labourers on Woodlark who produced 20,000 ounces of gold. Records show an estimated pre-World War II gold production, including alluvial sources, of about 220,000 ounces of gold.

Operation Chronicle was the name given to the landing of the United States' 112th Cavalry Regiment on Woodlark Island and Kiriwina on June 30, 1943, during World War II. Within a few months of the landing Seabees of the 60th Naval Construction Battalion had constructed a major airbase at Guasopa Bay, known as Woodlark Airfield (later Guasopa Airport).

The island has been extensively logged for ebony which has always been an important cash commodity to the communities on the island since the 1970s. Modern gold exploration was initiated on Woodlark Island in 1962 with the Bureau of Mineral Resources undertaking surface geochemistry, limited geophysics, and diamond drilling during 1962 and 1963 at Kulumadau.

== Population issue ==
The most recent figures are those of the 1990 census, which note about 1,700 people. The largest villages in the census were Kaulay (160), Moniveyova (140) and Wabunun (154), and these villages are the largest today. However, separate from the villages are the two post-colonial creations of Guasopa and Kulumadau (described in the census book as 'large rural non-villages'), which both have relatively large populations, 147 and 242 respectively. As such, Kulumadau is typically seen as the largest conglomeration of people on the island. Since the 1990 census, Guasopa has gained a health center, while Kulumadau has gained a medium-sized timber company (Milne Bay Logging) and a mining exploration camp (BHP).

In terms of the traditional divisions of the island, the eastern region (Muyuw) accounts for about 600 people (44% total population), central region (Wamwan) for 400 people (30% total population), and the southern region (Madau/Neyam) for 350 people (26% total population). An unofficial census in 2010 counts place the total population of Woodlark Island at around 6,000 people, with the largest conglomeration of people still in the non-villages of Kulumadau and Guasopa, and the largest village of Kaulay.

Historically, the island may have lost up to two-thirds of its population between 1850 and 1920, according to Fred Damon, an anthropology professor from the University of Virginia who lived on Woodlark Island in the mid-1970s. That is, from an estimated 2,200 people on Woodlark Island during first European contact, the population had dropped to between 700 and 900 by about 1915, though it has rebounded over the years.

== Geography ==
The wider Woodlark Islands group also consists of Madau, Boagis, Nusam and Nanon to the west, Nubara to the east, and the Marshall Bennett group to the southwest.

=== Geology ===
The island includes a volcanic core of Tertiary age and a wide limestone belt, mainly originated by corals (coral reefs are still active around the island). Also intrusive rocks and sedimentary sands are found.

== Fauna ==
=== Murua Gharial ===
An extinct gharial species, "Gavialis" papuensis (occasionally informally referred to as "Murua Gharial"), occurred in Woodlark Island during the Pleistocene or Holocene period. A late surviving gryposuchine, this 2–3-meter (6 ft 7 in – 9 ft 10 in) long piscivore was the last known truly marine crocodilian (modern saltwater crocodiles that still occur in the Solomon only occasionally venture into the sea, preferring freshwater environments), found in association with sirenian and sea turtle remains. Like other insular Pleistocene megafauna, it was presumably hunted to extinction by the first human settlers of the islands.

=== Conservation ===
A plan by the Malaysian company Vitroplant to use 70% of the island for palm oil production was scrapped after opposition from the islands inhabitants. The project was seen as a threat to endemic organisms on the island. As of 2009, a full wildlife survey of the island had not yet been carried out.

=== Endemic snakes ===
Due to its relative isolation, Woodlark Island is home to two endemic snake taxa.

- Candoia paulsoni sadlieri Smith et al., 2001 Woodlark Island ground boa - a subspecies of the widely distributed Melanesian ground boa Candoia paulsoni McDowell, 1979.
- Toxicocalamus longissimus Boulenger, 1896 Woodlark Island snake - a member of the endemic and inoffensive New Guinea worm-eating genusToxicocalamus.

There are no medically important terrestrial venomous snakes on Woodlark Island.

== Demographics ==
Muyuw language, one of the Kilivila–Louisiades languages and part of the Austronesian language family, is spoken on the island.
