= List of cemeteries in the Philippines =

This is a list of cemeteries located in Philippines provinces in Luzon, Visayas, and Mindanao regions. This list includes classical cemeteries (such as burial caves, burial mounds, limestone tombs, aerial cemeteries, coastal burial lands, and burial trees), colonial cemeteries (such as Spanish-style cemeteries and American-style cemeteries), and modern cemeteries (such as ash cemeteries).

== Relevance in Philippine Society ==
Cemeteries in the Philippines have several relevance in Philippine history and society. Cemeteries were used by Catholic Church in the Philippines to control negative sentiments by threatening not to bury the dissidents' loved ones. During the All Saints Day, these cemeteries comes to life as visitors clean up and repaint the tombs of their deceased loved ones. This holiday also becomes a time for family reunions where the favorite dishes of the deceased is served on top of their tombs.

== List of Cemeteries ==
- Baguio Cemetery, Baguio
- Clark Veterans Cemetery, Clark Freeport Zone
- Nagcarlan Underground Cemetery, Nagcarlan, Laguna - considered as the only underground cemetery in the Philippines
- San Joaquin Campo Santo, San Joaquin, Iloilo
- Batanes Boat Tombs
- Limestone tombs of Kamhantik
- Kabayan burial caves and other burial caves in the Cordilleras
- Sunken Cemetery, Camiguin
- Tagalog Burial Trees
- Hanging burial sites of Sagada
- Familia Luzuriaga Cemetery
- Paco Park cemetery - considered as the only remaining colonial cemetery in the country
- Bajau coastal cemetery

== See also ==
- List of cemeteries in Metro Manila
