= Baguio Cemetery =

Public cemetery in Baguio, Philippines

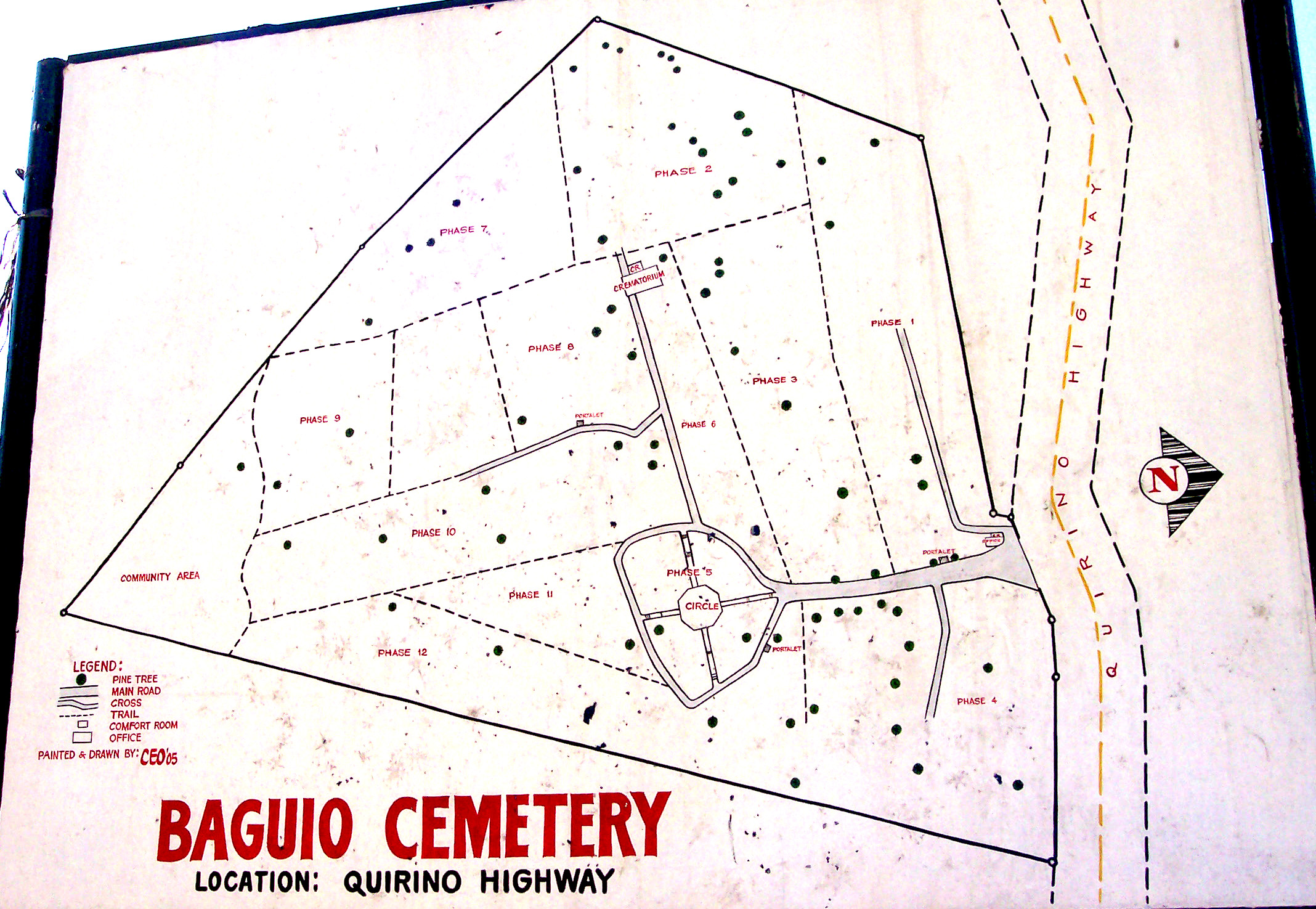
- Map of the cemetery

- Location within Luzon Location within Philippines

Details
- Location: Naguilian Road, Baguio
- Country: Philippines
- Coordinates: 16°24′42″N 120°34′30″E
- Type: Public
- Size: 94,800 square meters (23.4 acres)
- Find a Grave: Baguio Cemetery

Baguio Cemetery (also known as the Baguio Public Cemetery) is a 94,800-square-meter (23.4-acre) cemetery in the city of Baguio, Philippines, on top of a hill along Naguilian Road.

Established in the 1950s, the cemetery was overcrowded by 2011. Informal settlers, some working in the cemetery as tomb cleaners and painters, have settled in land allotted to the cemetery by the Baguio city government.

== See also ==
- List of cemeteries in the Philippines
