= List of cemeteries in Metro Manila =

There are a number of cemeteries in Metro Manila, Philippines. Among the biggest and oldest are those found in the district of Santa Cruz, namely the Manila North Cemetery, La Loma Cemetery and the Manila Chinese Cemetery. The Fort Bonifacio reservation in Taguig is home to the country's national cemetery called Libingan ng mga Bayani, as well as the Manila American Cemetery and The Heritage Park. There are also a number of crematoria and columbaria, particularly along Gregorio Araneta Avenue in the Tatalon and Santa Mesa Heights districts of Quezon City.

== List ==
Cemeteries in Metro Manila - order by founding date
Name	Established	Location	Notes
Paco Park	1814	Paco, Manila	Originally called Cementerio General de Dilao, it was converted into a national park in 1966. Notable burials include José Burgos, Mariano Gomez, Jacinto Zamora, José Rizal and Ramon Maria Solano.
La Loma Cemetery	1882	Santa Cruz, Manila / South Caloocan	The oldest cemetery in Manila still in use. Notable burials include Felipe Agoncillo, Marcela Agoncillo, Cayetano Arellano, Victorino Mapa, Dr. Augusto Vasquez, and Maria Lorena Barros.
Manila Chinese Cemetery	Mid-1880s	Santa Cruz, Manila	Carved out of the La Loma park, the cemetery was designated as the resting place for Chinese citizens denied burial in Catholic La Loma cemetery. Notable burials include Brigadier General and World War II hero Vicente Lim; and businessmen Dee C. Chuan and Ma Mon Luk.
Manila North Cemetery	1910	Santa Cruz, Manila	Also known by its Spanish name, Cementerio del Norte, it is the largest cemetery in the metropolis in terms of number of burials. Notable burials include Presidents Sergio Osmeña, Manuel Roxas, and Ramon Magsaysay; Governor-General Francis Burton Harrison; Senator Claro M. Recto; painter Félix Resurrección Hidalgo; boxer Pancho Villa, writer Epifanio de los Santos; architect Juan Nakpil; and actors Fernando Poe, Jr. and Susan Roces, Dr. Alberto I. Vasquez (Dentist), Hon. Josefa V. Mendoza (Barangay Chairwoman of Malate, Manila).
Manila South Cemetery	1925	San Andres, Manila	An exclave of San Andres, Manila within Makati. Notable burials include revolutionary Espiridiona Bonifacio; writer and politician Lope K. Santos; musician Lucrecia Roces Kasilag; and Manila politicians León Guinto, Ramon Bagatsing, Joey Hizon and Danny Lacuna.
Libingan ng mga Bayani	1947	Taguig	Also known as the Heroes' Cemetery. Notable burials include Presidents Elpidio Quirino, Carlos P. García, Diosdado Macapagal, Ferdinand E. Marcos, and Fidel V. Ramos; Vice President and Prime Minister Salvador Laurel; military officers Angelo Reyes, Rommel Sandoval and Danilo Lim; Foreign Secretary and President of the United Nations General Assembly Carlos P. Romulo; Chairperson of the Commission on Elections Haydee Yorac; National Scientist Perla Santos-Ocampo; and National Artists Guillermo Tolentino and Nora Aunor.
Manila American Cemetery and Memorial	1948	Taguig	The largest U.S. cemetery in the Asia-Pacific region built for U.S. personnel killed during World War II. Notable burials include Medal of Honor recipients Sergeant Robert A. Owens, Second Lieutenant Dale Eldon Christensen, Colonel Louis J. Van Schaick, and Private First Class Charles H. Roan; German-born American officer Herman Bottcher; and Brigadier General James Dalton II.
Manila Memorial Park – Sucat	1964	Parañaque	Notable burials include members of the Aquino family of Tarlac (Presidents Corazon Aquino and Benigno Aquino III, and Senator Benigno Aquino Jr.); members of the López family of Iloilo (ABS-CBN President and Chairman Eugenio "Geny" Lopez Jr. and Environment Secretary Regina "Gina" Lopez); politicians Narciso Ramos, Pablo Cuneta, Leandro Mendoza, Robert Barbers and Roy Señeres; actors Rico Yan, AJ Perez, Paquito Diaz and Chat Silayan; television personalities Lourdes "Inday Badiday" Jimenez Carvajal, and Helen Vela; sports analyst and commentator Ronnie Nathanielsz; social media personality Jam Sebastian; accountant and businessman Alfonso Yuchengco; and professional boxer Gabriel "Flash" Elorde.
Loyola Memorial Park	1964 (Marikina); 1972 (Parañaque)	Marikina and Parañaque	Notable burials include: in Marikina: rapper Francis Magalona; television personality German Moreno; actors Julie Vega, Nida Blanca, Johnny Delgado, Luz Fernandez and Jay Ilagan; Senators Miriam Defensor Santiago, Rogelio de la Rosa and Ernesto Maceda; comedian Tado Jimenez; artist Fernando Amorsolo; journalists Mario Dumaual and Mike Enriquez; MMDA Chairman and Marikina mayor Bayani Fernando; and former House Minority Leader Edcel Lagman. Also buried in the cemetery are several victims of the 1996 Ozone Disco fire. in Parañaque: musicians Claire dela Fuente and Joseph William "Pepe" Smith; television host Susan Calo-Medina; and actors Miko Sotto, Gloria "Mona Lisa" Yatco and Pablito "Babalu" Sarmiento.
Holy Cross Memorial Park	1965	Quezon City	Notable burials include comedians and actors Myrna "Tiya Pusit" Villanueva and Herminio "Butch" Bautista.
Himlayang Pilipino	1971	Quezon City	Notable burials include revolutionary Emilio Jacinto; directors Wenn V. Deramas and Maryo J. de los Reyes; internet personality Emman Nimedez; radio personality Cesar "Speed Bagal" Nucum; actor Lito Calzado; comedians Noemi "Mahal" Tesorero, Adelaida "Dely Atay-Atayan" Fernando-Villegas and Serafin "Apeng Daldal" Gabriel; and publicist and murder victim Salvador "Bubby" Dacer.
Eternal Gardens Memorial Park	1976	South Caloocan / Quezon City	Notable burials include actors Romy Diaz and Dick Israel; and radio personality Romulo "Tita Swarding" Espeña.
Golden Haven Memorial Park	1982	Las Piñas	Founded by businessman and politician Manny Villar. Also found across the country, the company was listed in the Philippine Stocks Exchange (PSE) in 2016, the first and only death care company to be given the distinction.
Everest Hills Memorial Park	1991	Muntinlupa	
Ever Memorial Garden	1992	Valenzuela	
The Heritage Park	2001	Taguig	Also known as the Heritage Memorial Park. Located adjacent to the Libingan ng mga Bayani. Notable burials include businessman Henry Sy; actors Dolphy, Rudy "Daboy" Fernandez, Charlie Davao, Jose Mari Gonzales and Liezl Martinez; musician Rico J. Puno; and lawyer and Solicitor-General Francisco "Frank" Chavez.

== Gallery ==
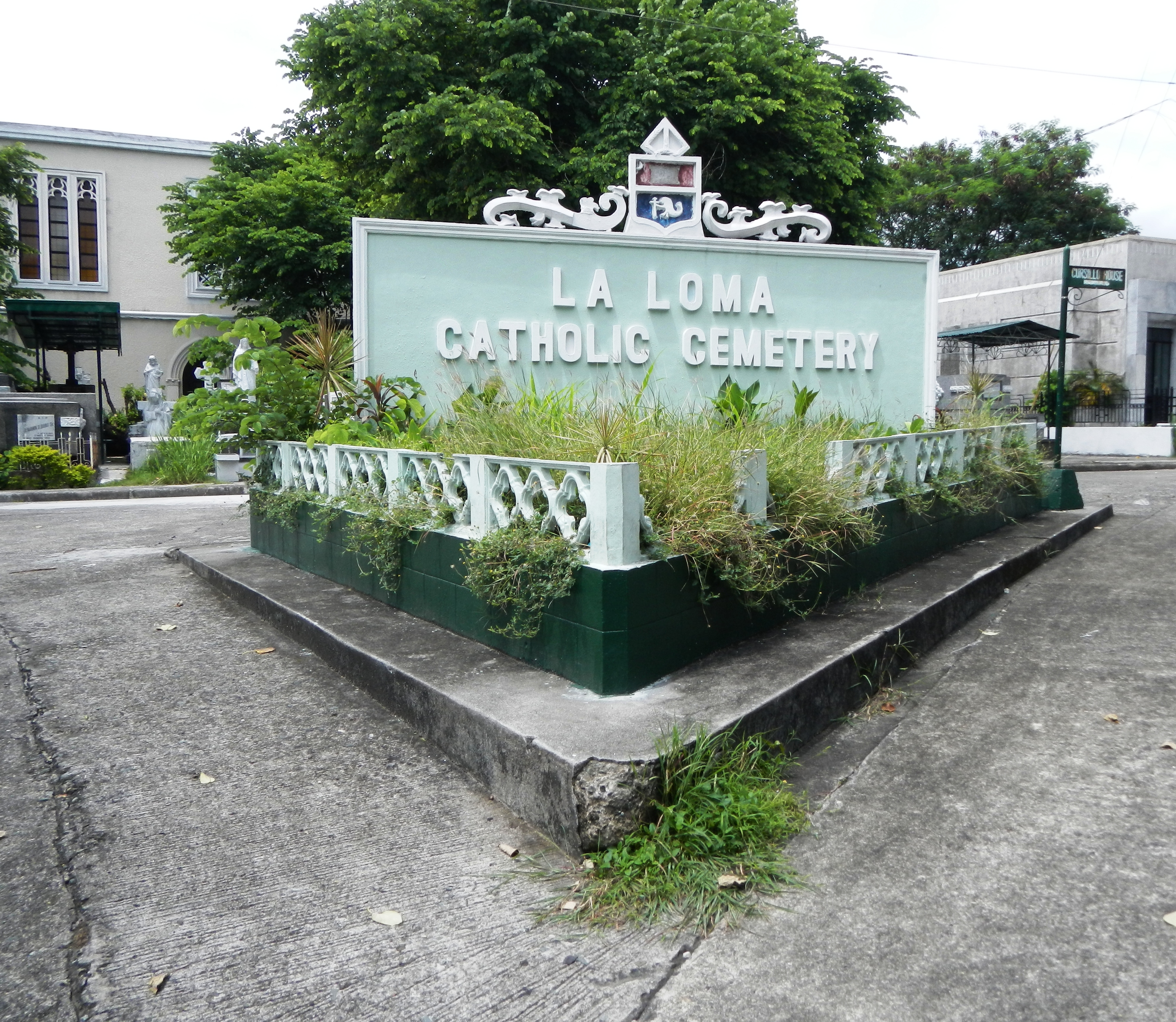
Entrance to the La Loma Cemetery

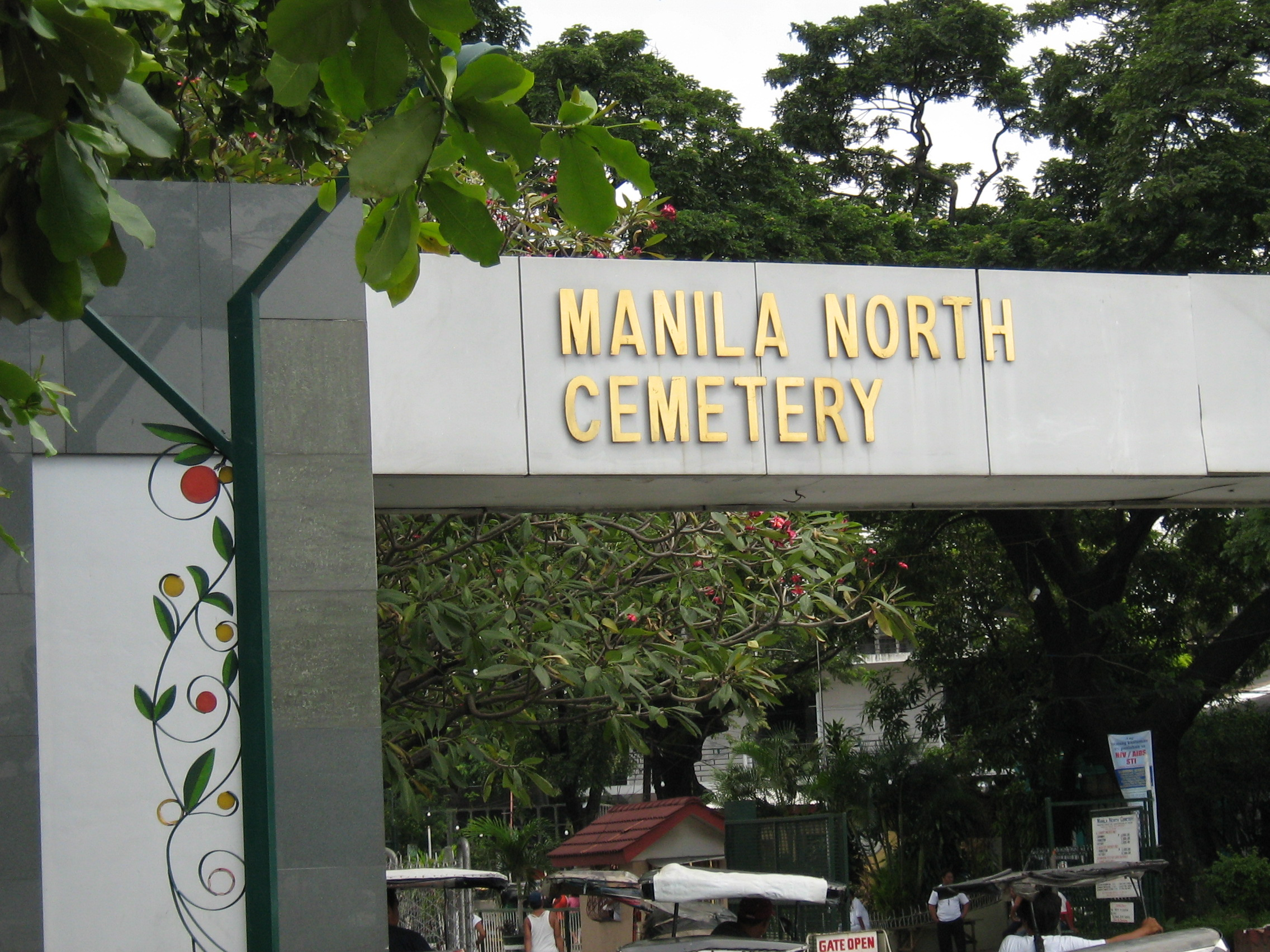
Manila North Cemetery
Main Gate

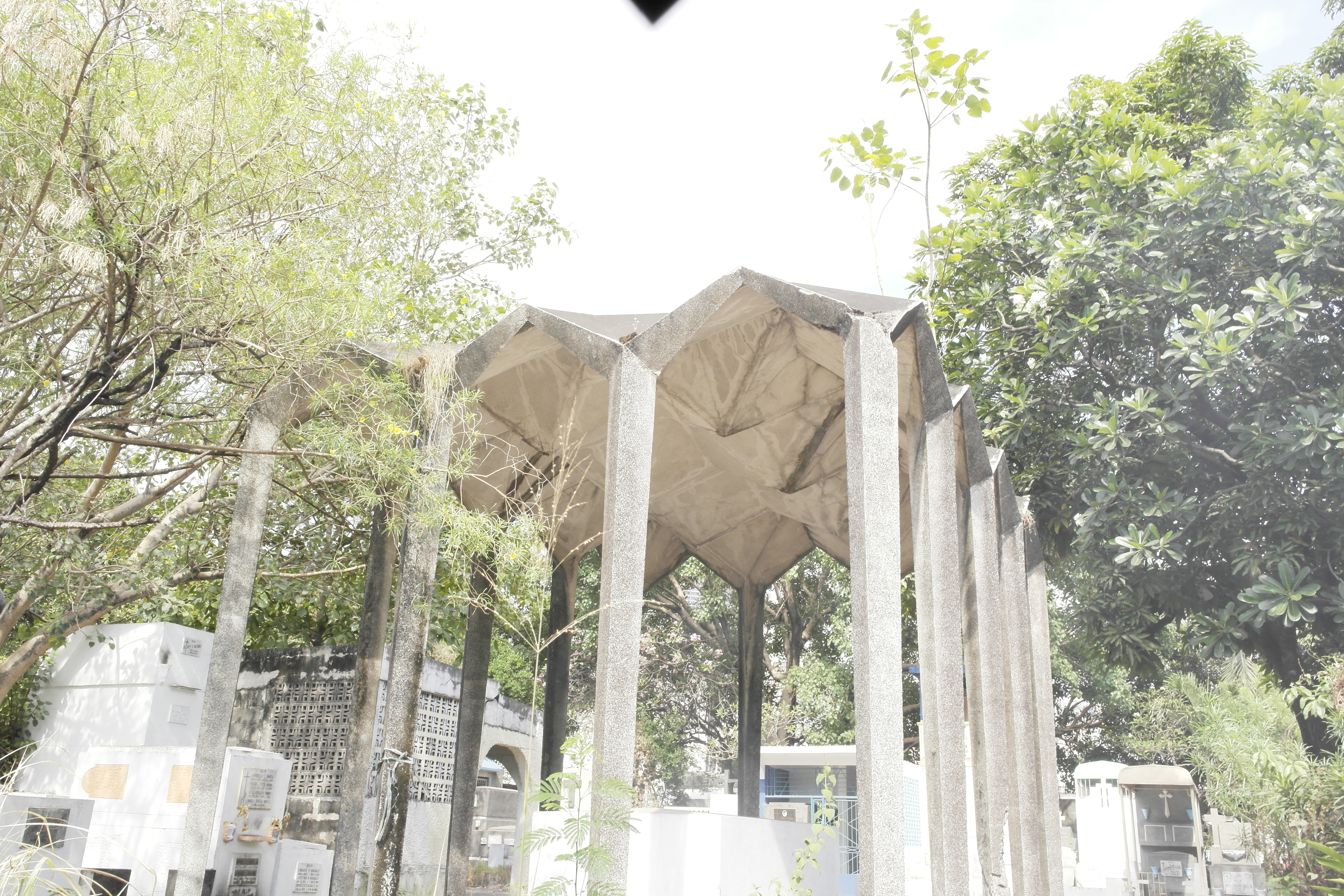
Inside the Manila South Cemetery

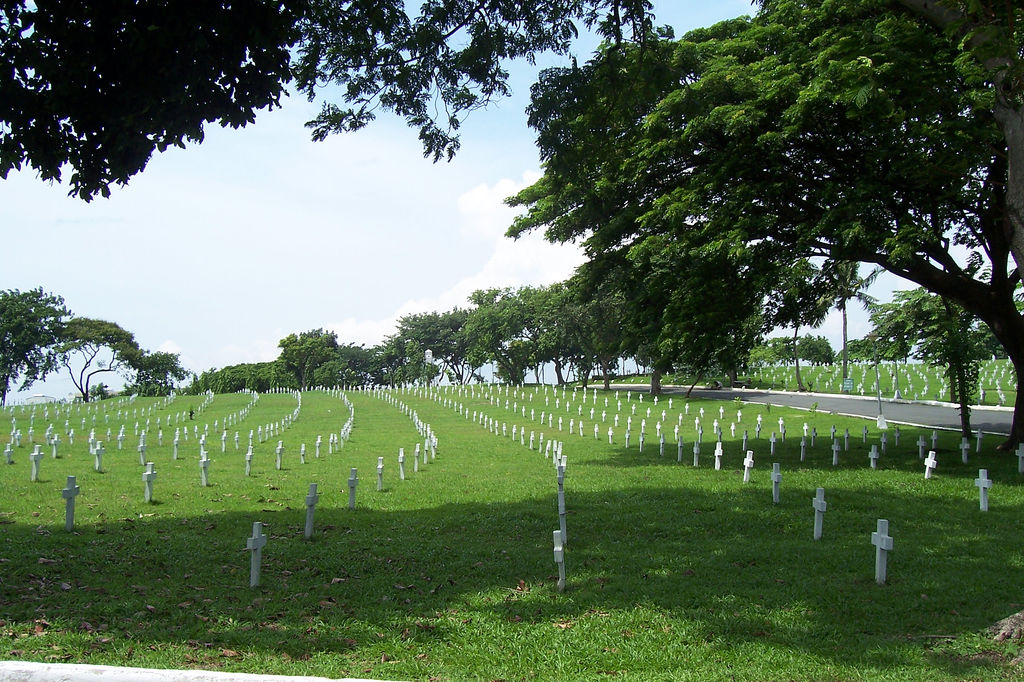
Libingan ng mga Bayani

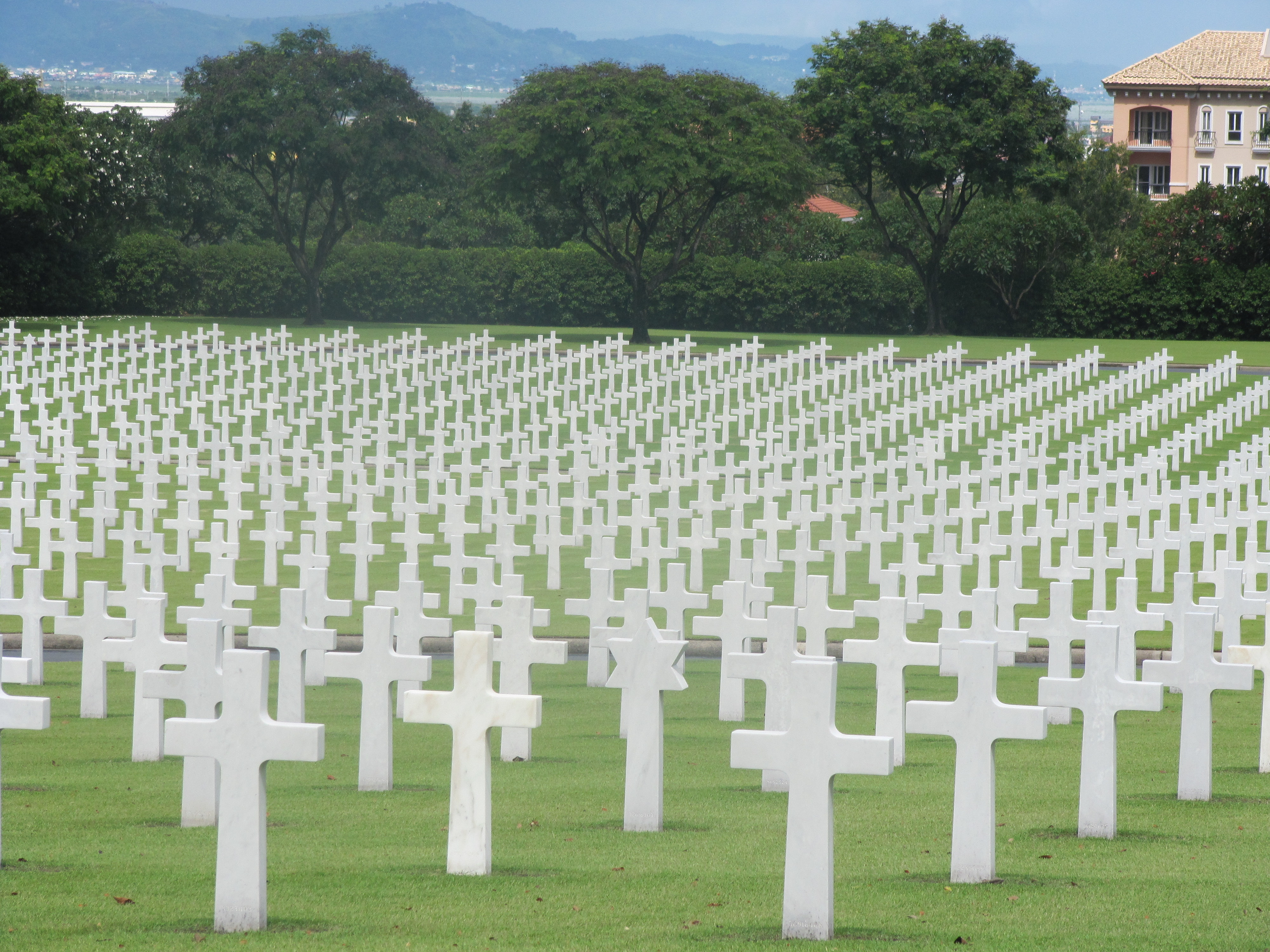
Manila American Cemetery and Memorial

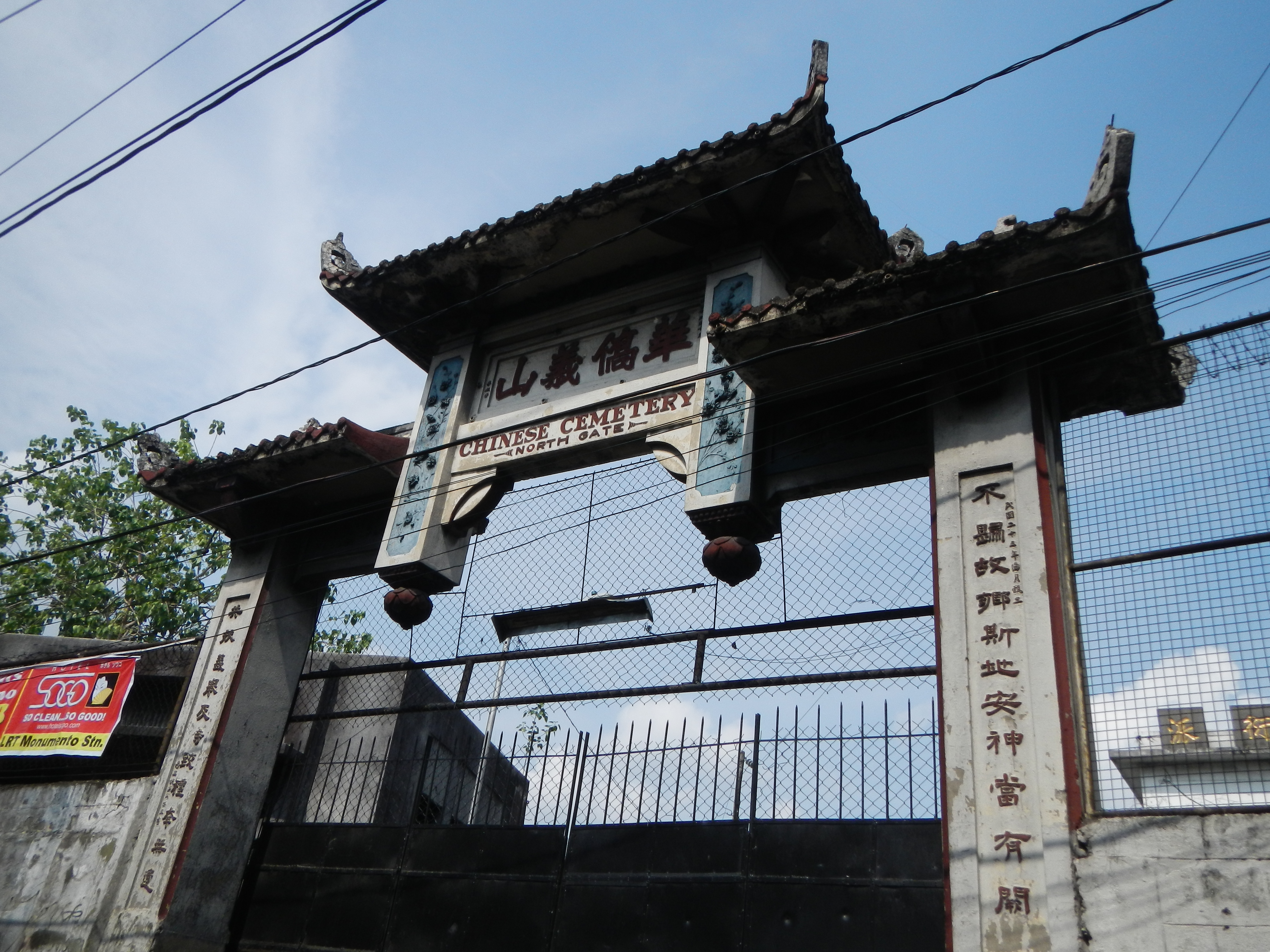
Manila Chinese Cemetery
North Gate

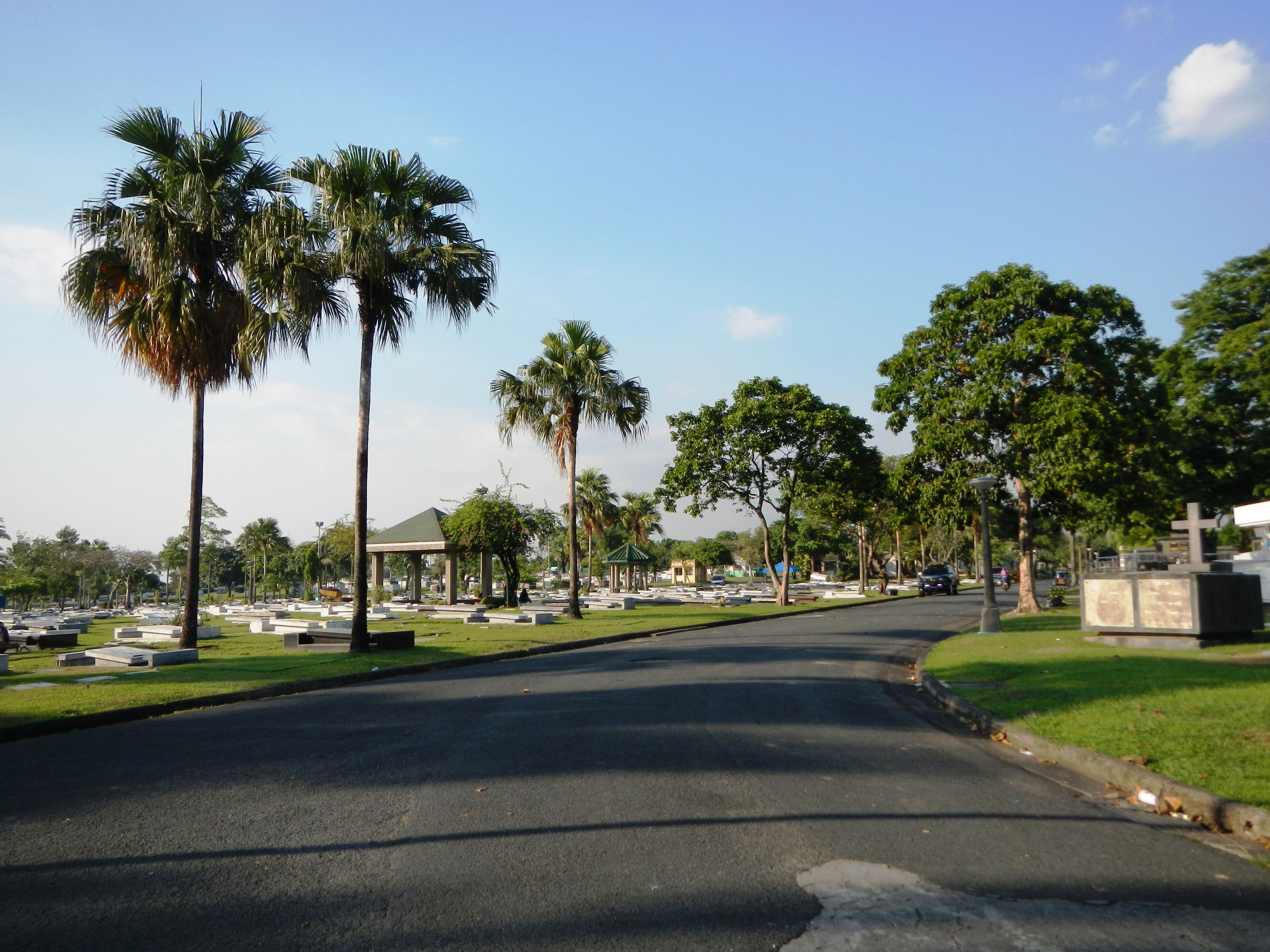
Inside the Holy Cross Memorial Park in Novaliches

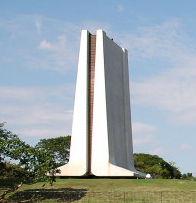
The Meditation Tower at the Manila Memorial Park in Parañaque

== See also ==
- List of cemeteries in the Philippines
