= San Joaquin Church (Iloilo) =

Roman Catholic church in Iloilo, Philippines

San Joaquín Church
- San Joaquín Parish Church
- Iglesia Parroquial de San Joaquín (Spanish)
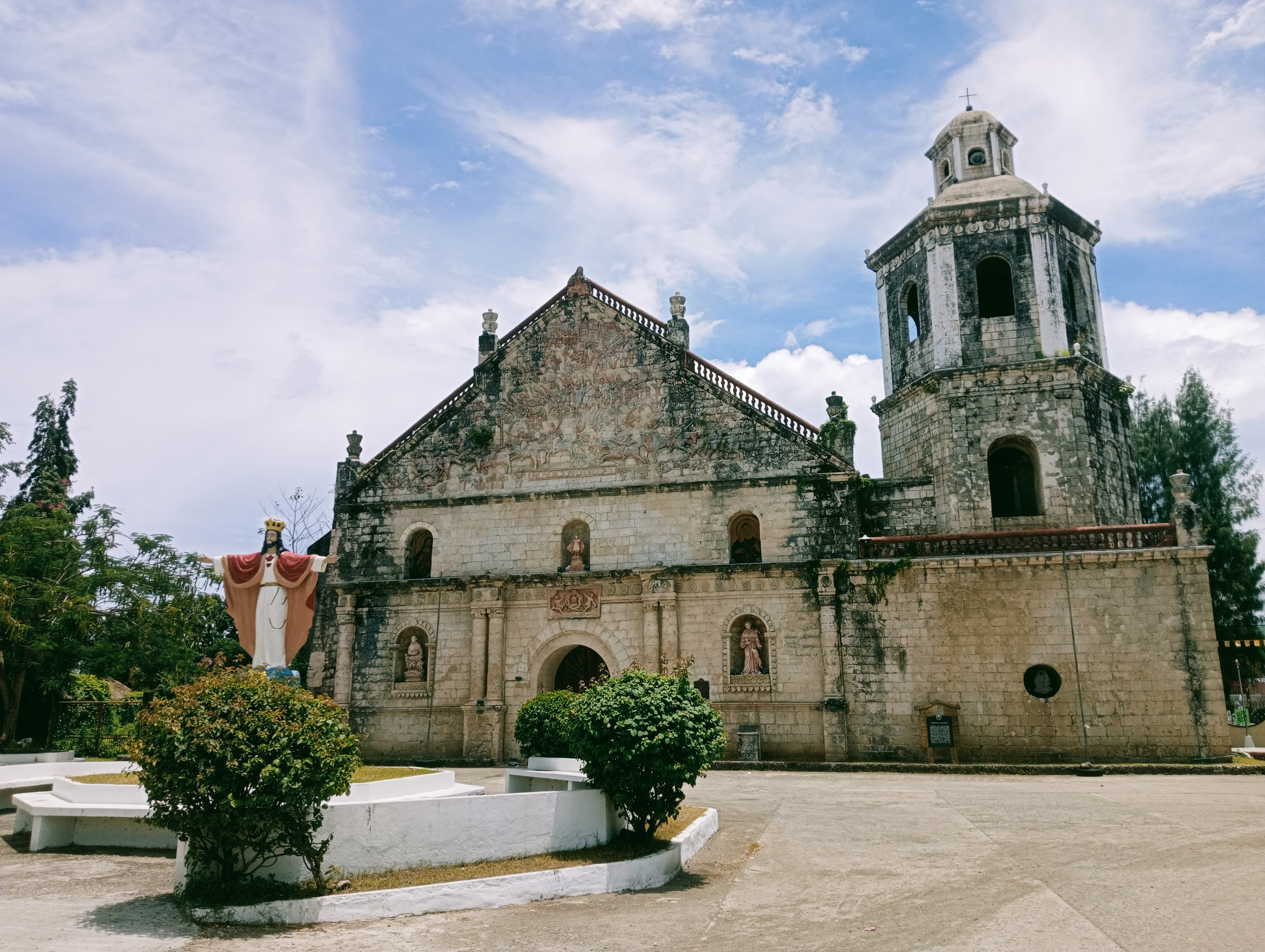
- Church façade in 2024

- Location in the Visayas Location in the Philippines
- 10°35′09″N 122°08′27″E
- Country: Philippines
- Language(s): Hiligaynon, English
- Denomination: Roman Catholic
- Tradition: Roman Rite

History
- Status: Parish church
- Dedication: Saint Joachim

Architecture
- Functional status: Active
- Heritage designation: National Cultural Treasure
- Designated: 2001
- Architect(s): Fr. Tomas Santaren, O.S.A.
- Architectural type: Church building
- Style: Baroque architecture
- Groundbreaking: 1859
- Completed: 1869; 157 years ago

Specifications
- Materials: Limestone

Administration
- Archdiocese: Jaro
- Deanery: Sts. Philip and James
- Parish: San Joaquin

San Joaquin Parish Church, commonly known as San Joaquin Church, is a Roman Catholic Church in the municipality of San Joaquín, Iloilo, Philippines, under the jurisdiction of the Archdiocese of Jaro. It is largely known for its pediment featuring a military scene: Spanish victory over the Moors in the Battle of Tétouan. The church was declared a National Cultural Treasure by the National Museum of the Philippines.

== History ==
Construction on the San Joaquín Church was completed in 1869 during the late Spanish colonial era by Augustinians. The convent of the San Joaquín Church was left in ruins after World War II, leaving its noted well and kiln which were used for baking.

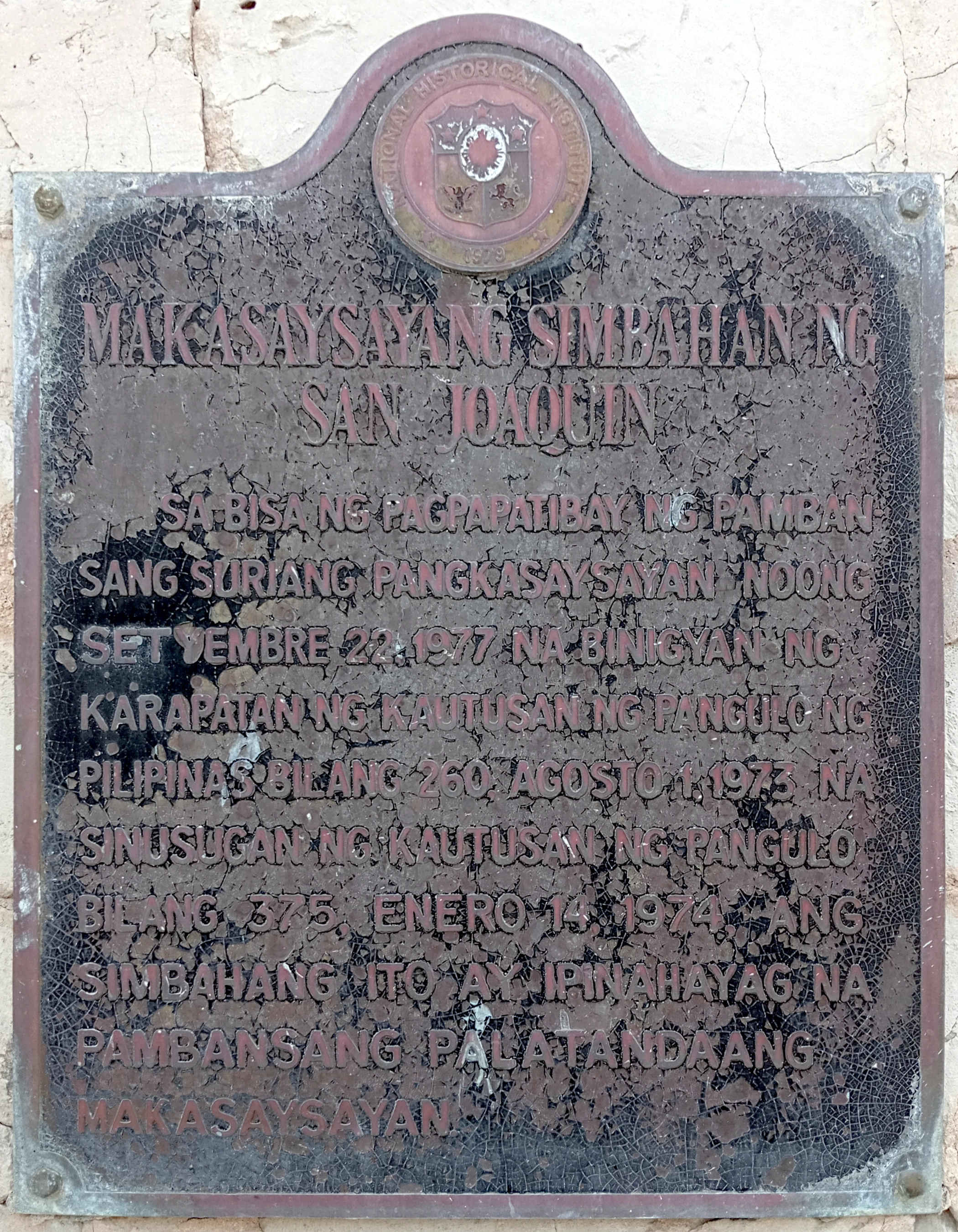
The church’s NHI historical marker

The then National Historical Institute marked the church as a National Historical Site in 1980 pursuant to Presidential Decree Nos. 260 of 1973 and 375 of 1974, both issued by President Ferdinand Marcos.

In the 1980s, the church structure underwent renovations. The side and back walls, as well as the sanctuary, were reinforced by cement under orders from the local priest; heritage conservationists decried it as a loss of structural integrity and authenticity.

The structure was declared a National Cultural Treasure (NCT) by the National Museum of the Philippines (NMP) in 2001. The declaration includes the convent ruins in the church complex.

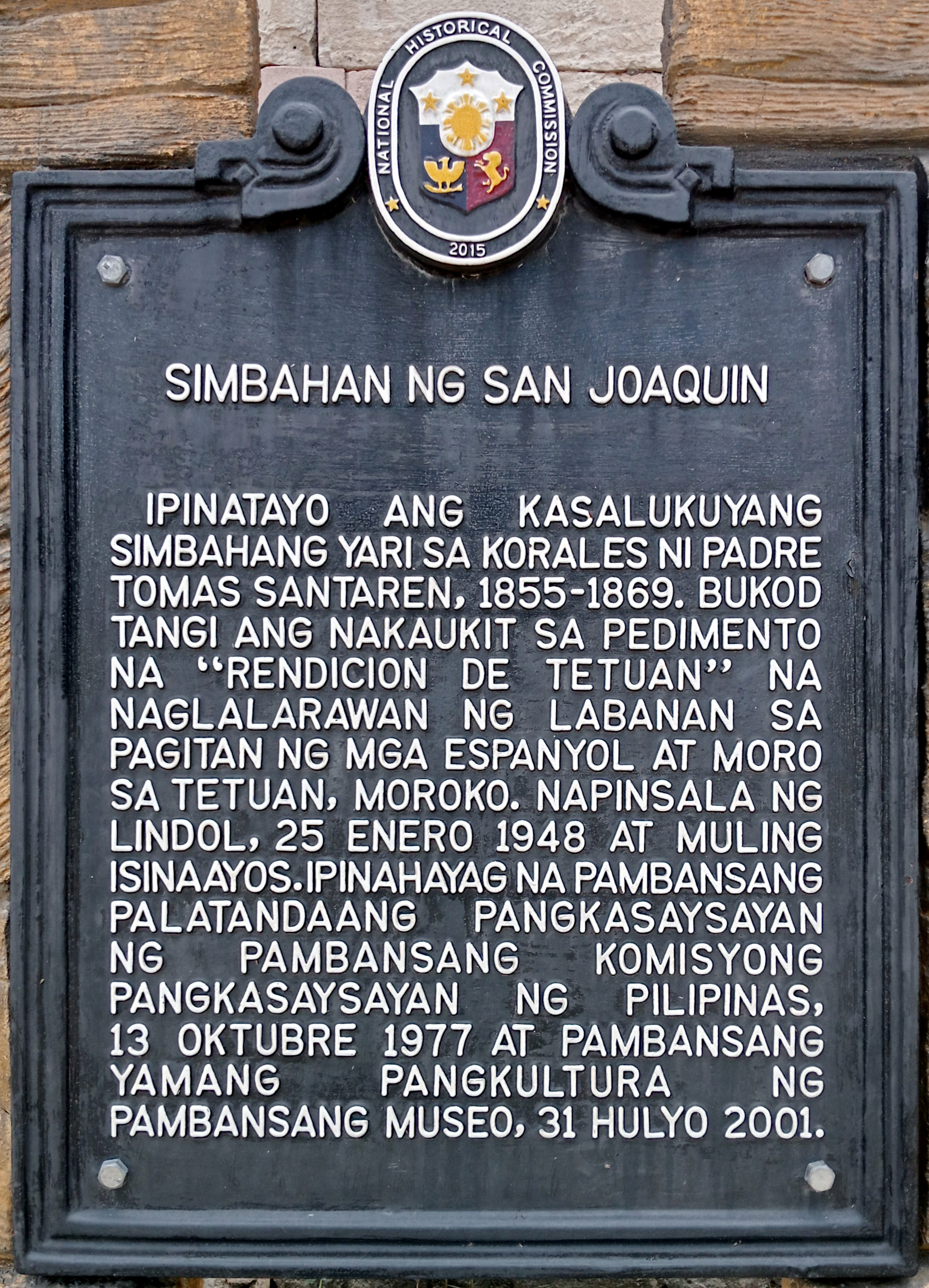
Church NHCP historical marker

In 2015, another restoration was completed under the watch of the National Historical Commission of the Philippines, but the palitada (“lime plaster”) which covered the façade chipped off in less than a year, which led to heritage conservationists criticizing the NHCP.

Following the declaration of the San Joaquin Campo Santo cemetery as a National Cultural Treasure by the National Museum of the Philippines, the heritage organization labelled the church complex and the cemetery as the "San Joaquin Church Complex and Campo Santo of San Joaquin, Iloilo".

On January 19, 2019, the Parish of San Joaquin celebrated the 150th anniversary of its completion under Fray Tomás Santaren, OSA. The parishioners with the priests assigned helped together to re-enhance the interior design of the church and making all ways of restoring the original designs especially of the tabernacle and high altar, with its gradas and the side altar retablos. All designs were carefully made to reflect the originals The church was solemnly dedicated by His Excellency Most Rev. José Romeo O. Lazo, DD, on January 18, 2019.

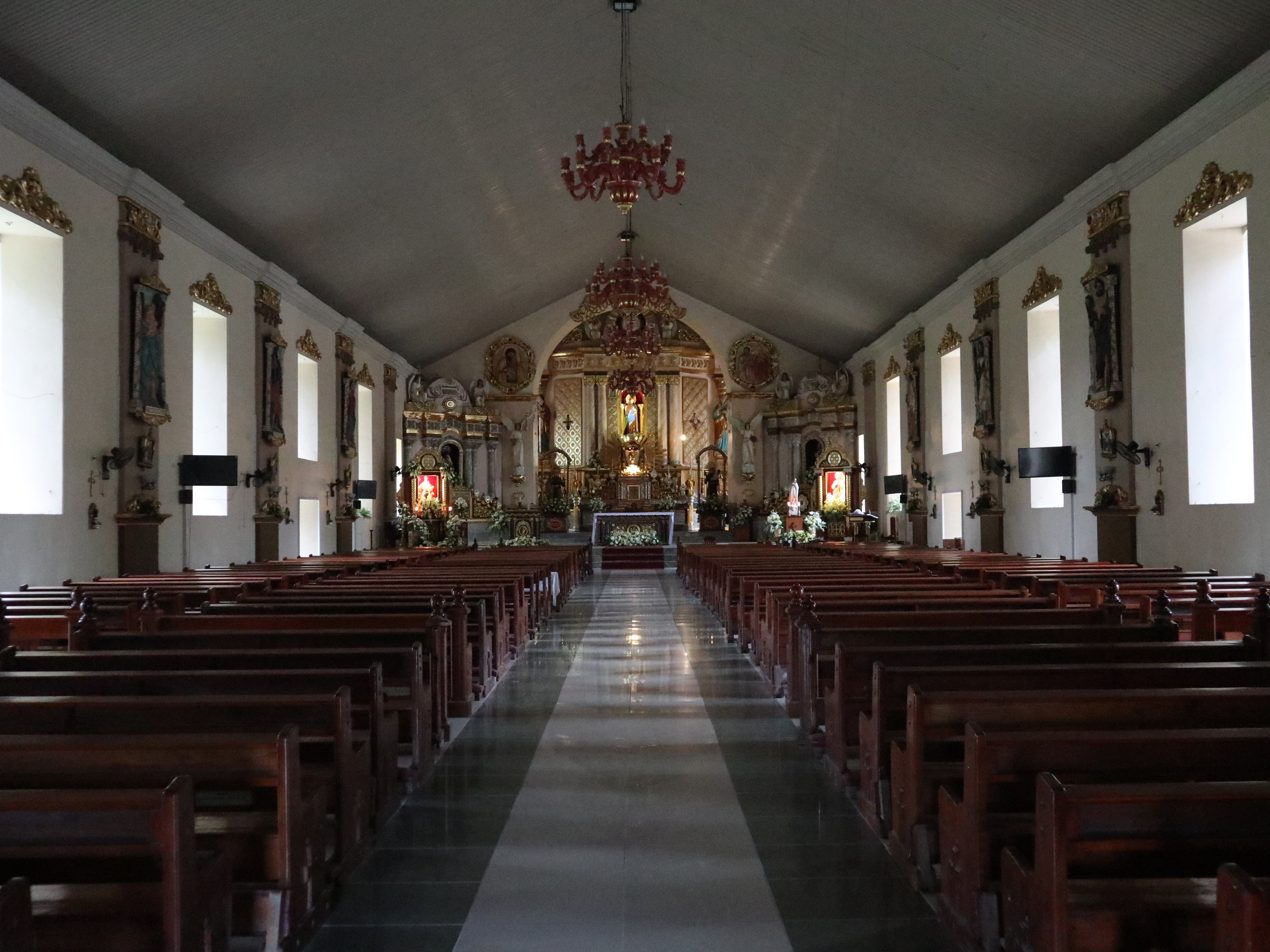
Church interior, 2023

Adjacent to the church is the new Adoration Chapel, which was blessed during the annual fiesta celebrations on January 19, 2019.

== Features ==
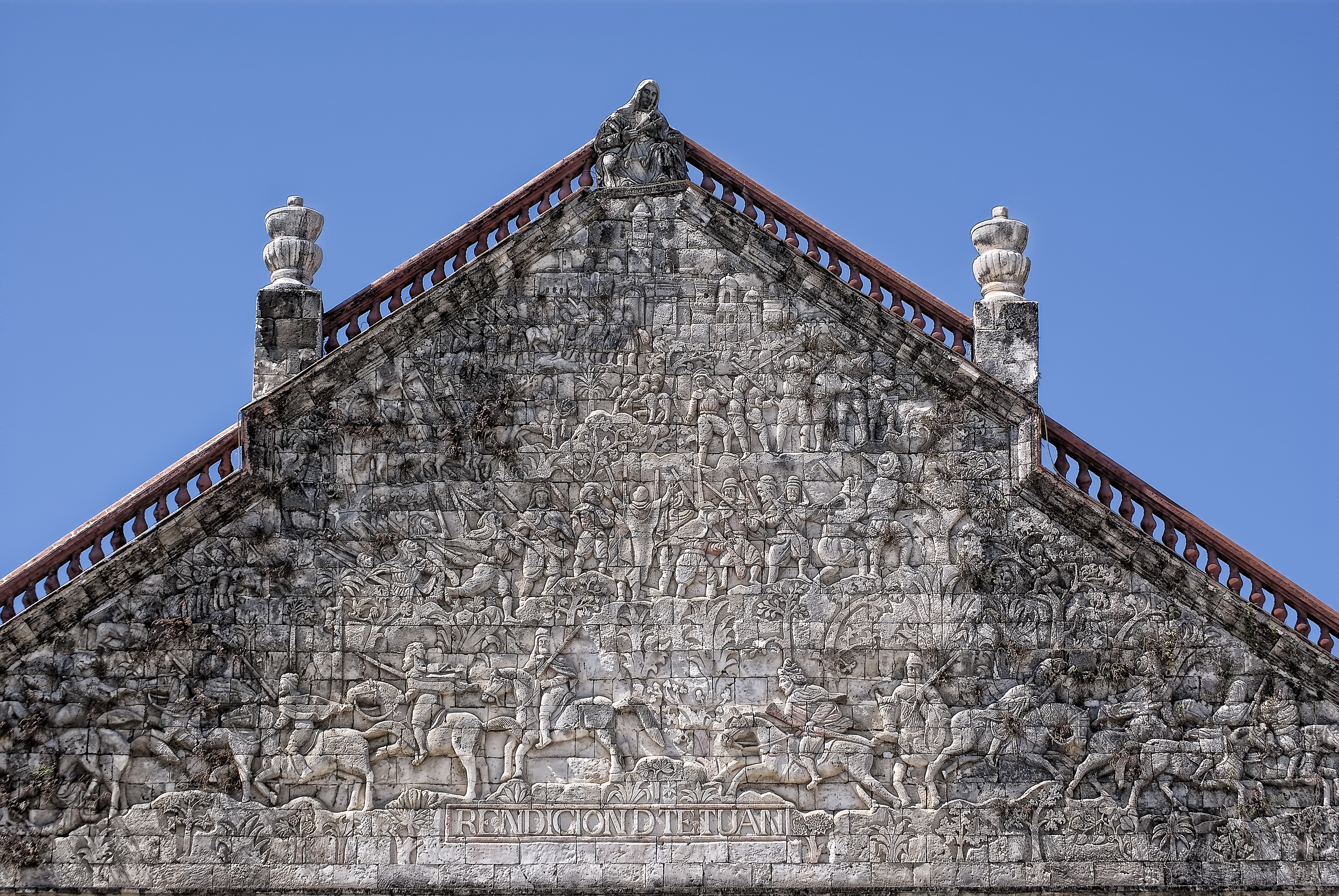
The pediment of the San Joaquín Church, with a frieze of the Battle of Tétouan

Highlights of the church include its three retablos of carved limestone, which were formerly polychromed, the carved pediment which features a folk portrayal of the Spanish defeating the Moors at the Battle near Tétouan, Morocco, as well as its adjacent sprawling ruins containing an oven well and kiln for baking.
