= San Joaquin, Iloilo =

Municipality in Iloilo, Philippines

San Joaquin Suaraga
- Municipality
- Municipality of San Joaquin
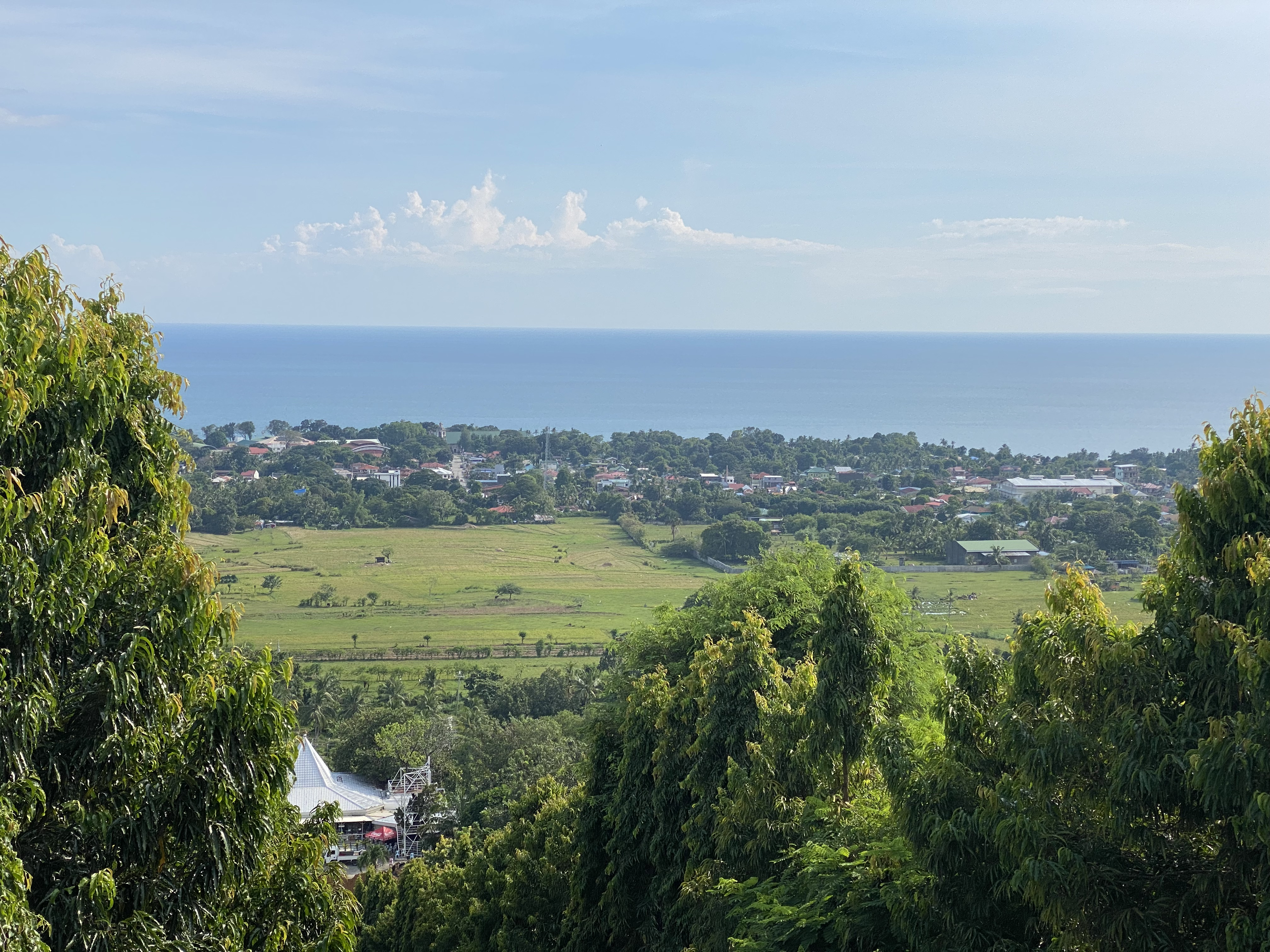
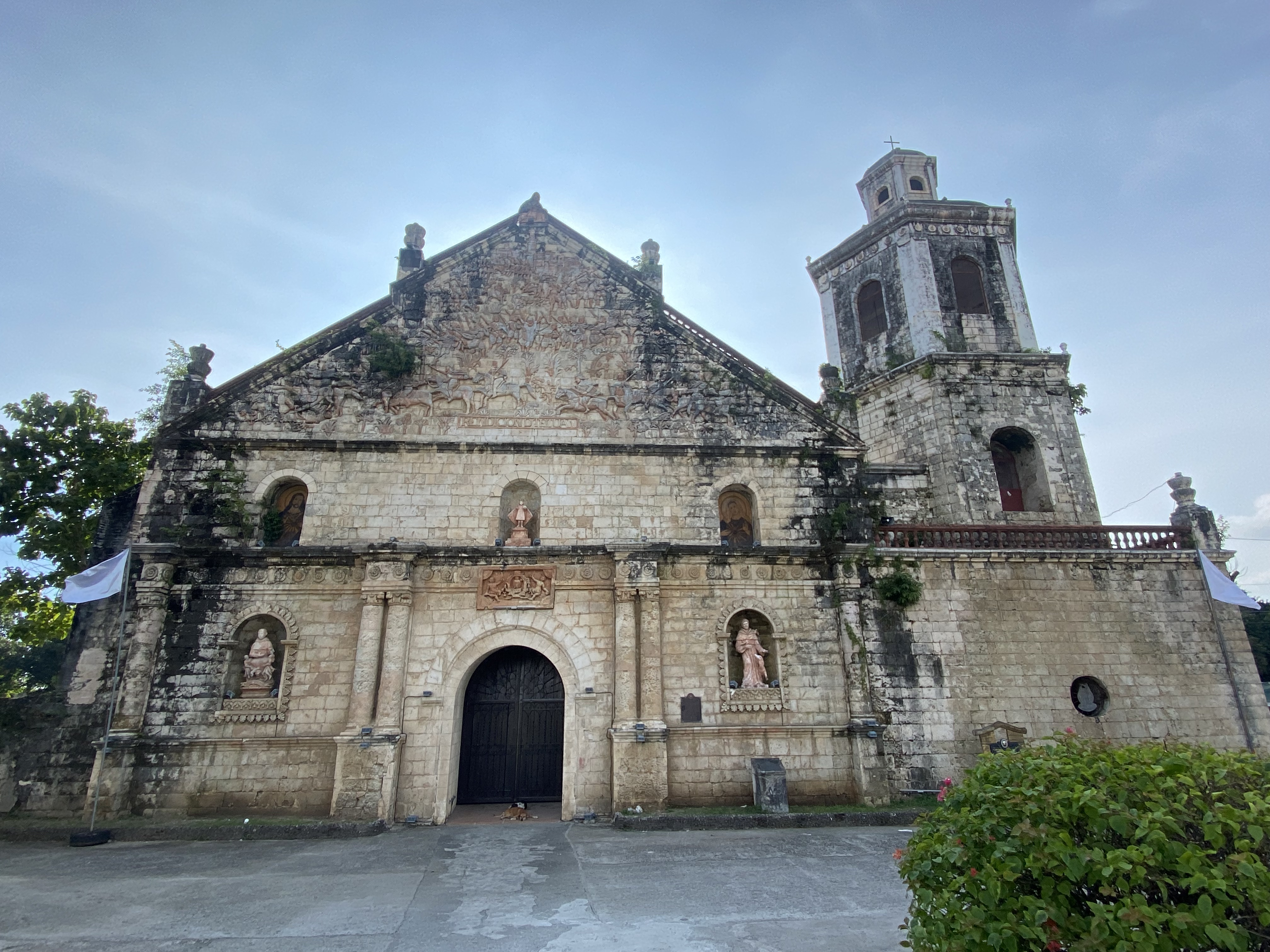
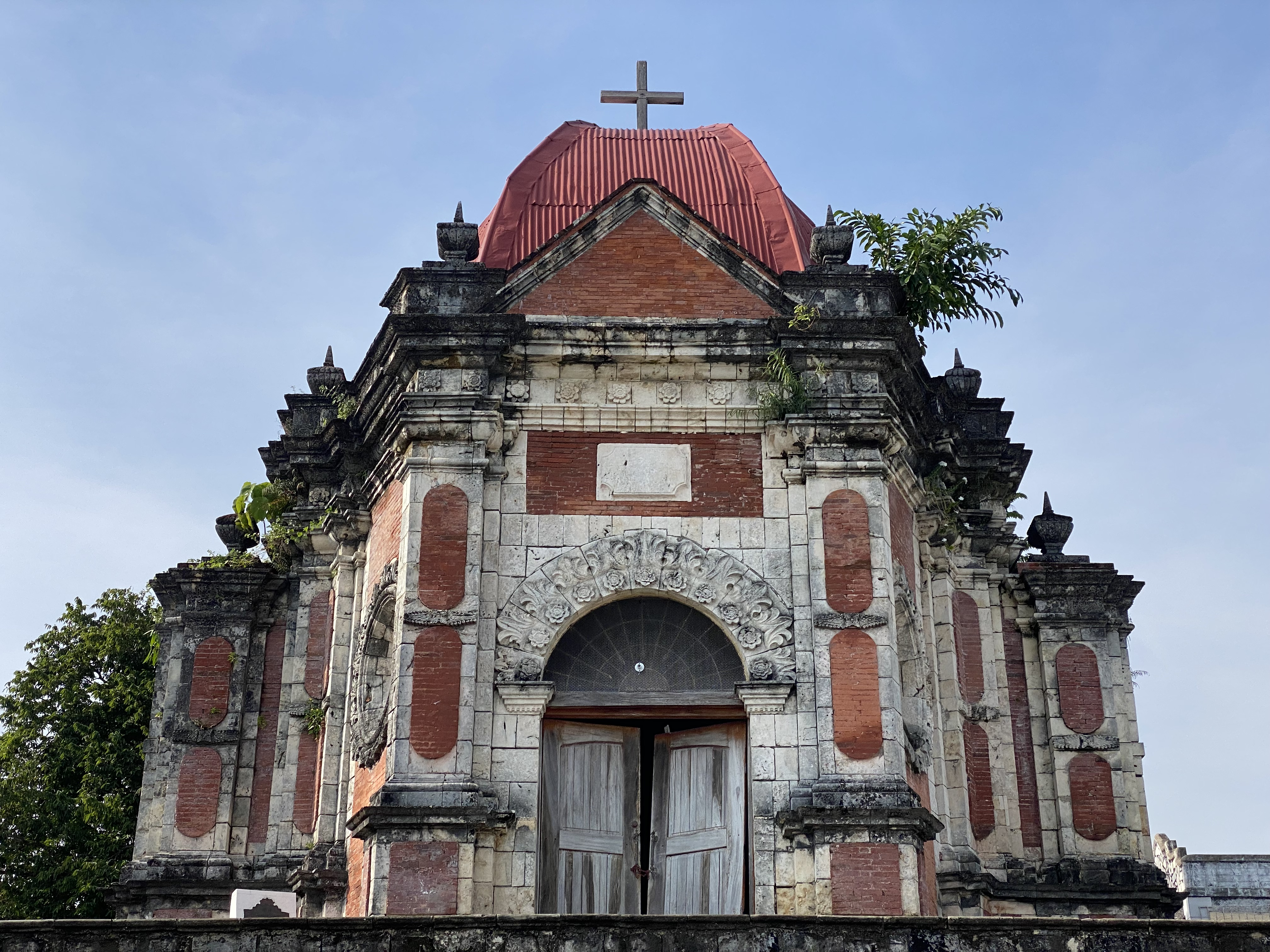
- Aerial view of the town center (Poblacion) San Joaquín Parish Church San Joaquin Campo Santo

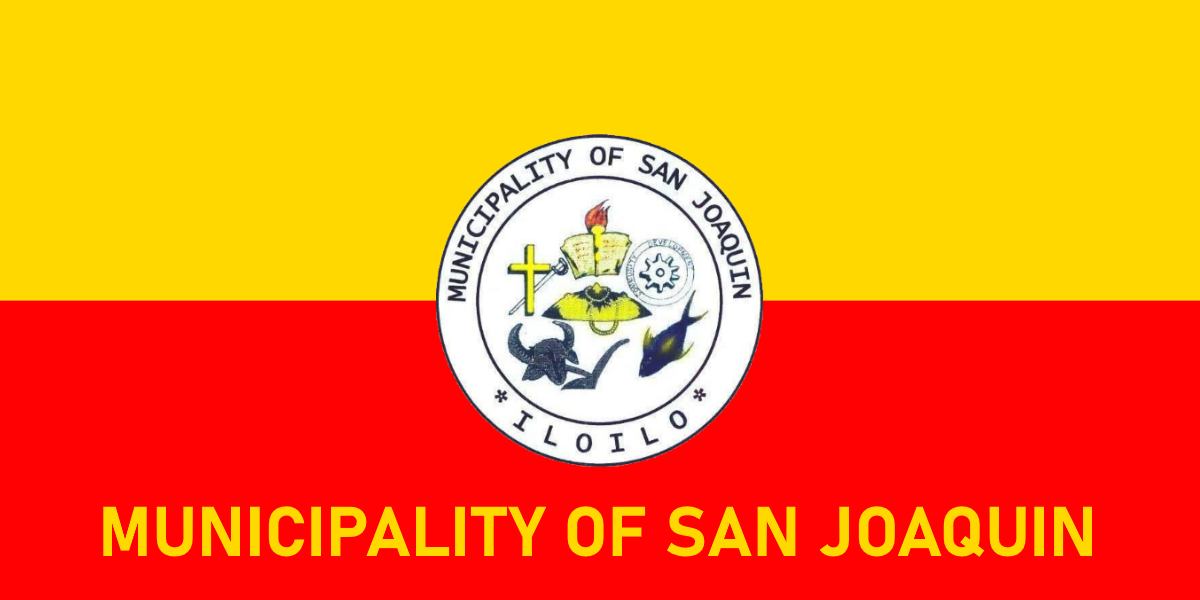
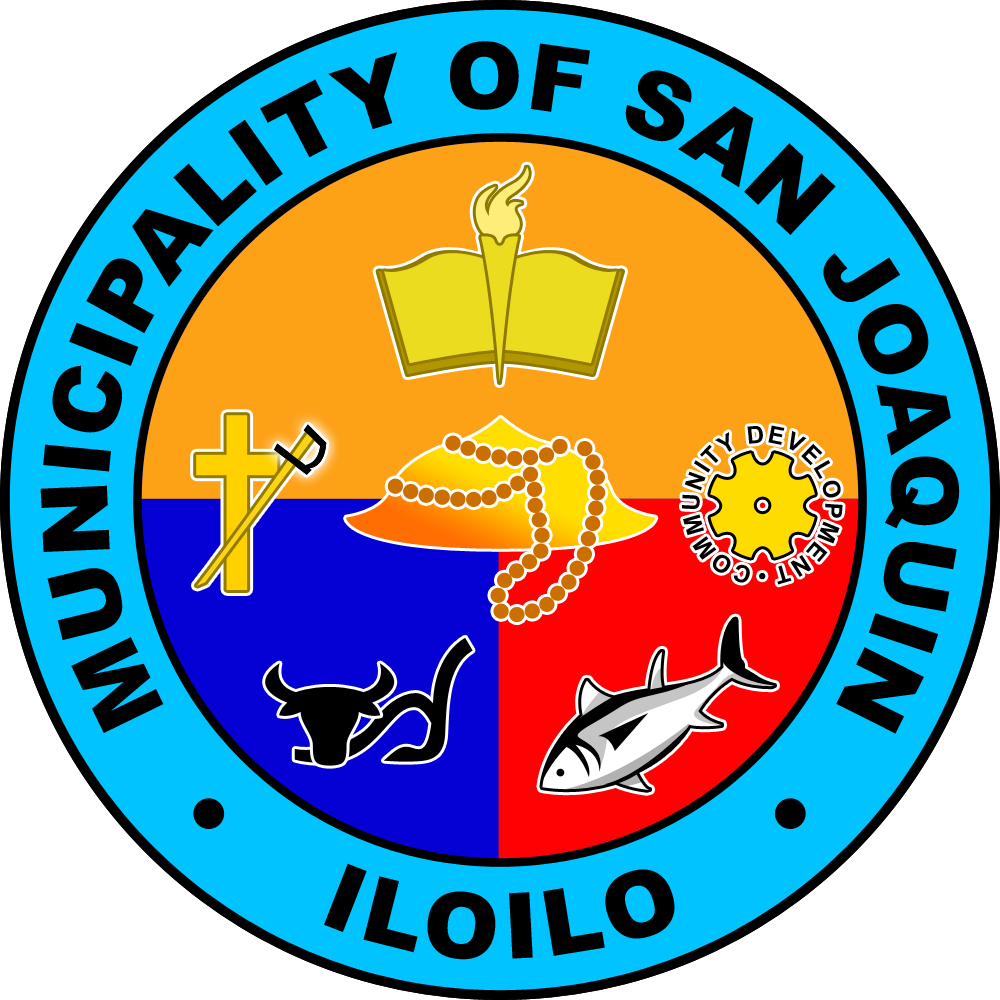
- Flag Seal

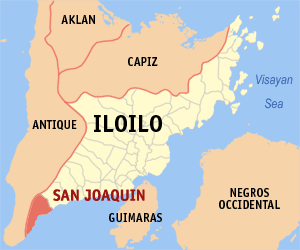
- Map of Iloilo with San Joaquin highlighted
- Interactive map of San Joaquin
- Location within the Philippines
- Coordinates: 10°36′N 122°05′E
- Country: Philippines
- Region: Western Visayas
- Province: Iloilo
- District: 1st district
- Founded: 1692
- Reincorporated: December 10, 1910
- Barangays: 85 (see Barangays)

Government
  - Type: Sangguniang Bayan
  - Mayor: Joe Abad S. Lazaro Jr. (Liberal)
  - Vice Mayor: Ivy Mae T. Selibio-Crespo (Lakas)
  - Representative: Janette L. Garin (Lakas)
  - Municipal Council: Members: Ma. Luz S. Sandoy (Lakas); Rhalyn Erika G. Sarinas (Lakas); Marvigrace G. Lago (Liberal); Garry S. Secuban (Lakas); Catalino E. Santacera (Lakas); Pedro Joey S. Seasat (Lakas); Igmedio S. Prado Jr. (Liberal); Josephine S. Daulo (Lakas); Rafael S. Seriritan ^{‡}; Mykel Josh S. Mondragon ^{◌}; ‡ ex officio ABC president; ◌ ex officio SK chairman
  - Electorate: 32,684 voters (2025)

Area
  - Total: 234.84 km^{2} (90.67 sq mi)
- Elevation: 75 m (246 ft)
- Highest elevation: 1,043 m (3,422 ft)
- Lowest elevation: 0 m (0 ft)

Population (2024 census)
  - Total: 52,773
  - Density: 224.72/km^{2} (582.02/sq mi)
  - Households: 12,752
- Demonym: San Joaquinhons

Economy
  - Income class: 1st municipal income class
  - Poverty incidence: 19.29% (2023)
  - Revenue: ₱ 252.5 million (2024)
  - Assets: ₱ 1,128 million (2024)
  - Expenditure: ₱ 54.78 million (2024)
  - Liabilities: ₱ 191 million (2024)

Service provider
  - Electricity: Iloilo 1 Electric Cooperative (ILECO 1)
  - Water: San Joaquin Water District (SJWD)
- Time zone: UTC+8 (PST)
- ZIP code: 5024
- PSGC: 063040000
- IDD : area code: +63 (0)33
- Native languages: Karay-a; Hiligaynon; Ati; Tagalog
- Feast date: Third Saturday of January (Feast of Señor Santo Niño); August 16 (Feast of Señor San Joaquin)
- Catholic diocese: Archdiocese of Jaro
- Patron saint: Saint Joachim

San Joaquin, officially the Municipality of San Joaquin (Kinaray-a: Banwa kang San Joaquin; Hiligaynon: Banwa sang San Joaquin; Tagalog: Bayan ng San Joaquin, IPA: [sɐn (h)waˈkin]), is a municipality in the province of Iloilo, Philippines. According to the 2024 census, it has a population of 52,773 people.

== History ==
=== Spanish Colonial Period ===
The history of San Joaquin, Iloilo, can be traced back to the late 17th century, with significant developments in its religious and civic structure. According to historical records, the town’s foundation is marked by a series of key events related to its missionary history.

In 1687, San Joaquin was assigned its own minister, which signified the town’s initial formal recognition by the church. However, the minister only stayed for a year before the settlement became a Visita—a mission station that lacked a permanent parish priest. The town remained as a Visita until 1692, when it was officially established as a parish. During this period, San Joaquin was under the ecclesiastical jurisdiction of Miagao.

The 1692 date is widely considered the certain foundation date of San Joaquin as a parish, according to sources like Juan Fernandez's Monografías de los pueblos de la isla de Pan-ay and Elviro Jorde's Catálogo bio bibliográfico.

Fr. Felipe Alfaraz, a notable Augustinian missionary, played a significant role in the town’s religious history. According to Jorde’s Misión 65 (1788), Fr. Alfaraz was assigned as parish priest to several towns, including San Joaquin in 1794, having previously served in Lambunao (1790) and Guimbal (1801). One enduring legacy of this era is the San Joaquin Roman Catholic Church, which was completed in 1869 and declared a national shrine in September 1977.

=== American Colonial Period ===
After the Spanish-American War and the establishment of American rule in the Philippines, significant changes were introduced in the governance and administrative structures of towns in Iloilo, including San Joaquin. The American colonization introduced new administrative systems that aimed to streamline governance and adapt the region to Western-style municipal structures. The consolidation of municipalities became a key aspect of this process.

On April 11, 1901, the American colonial government officially organized the civil government of Iloilo Province, which initially included 50 municipalities. These municipalities were placed under the supervision of the new American administration, with a goal of bringing order and structure to the region. San Joaquin was one of the towns included in the initial organization of municipalities, albeit a relatively smaller and less economically developed town compared to others in the province.

In a move to further streamline governance, the American government passed Act No. 719 on April 4, 1903, which aimed to reduce the number of municipalities in Iloilo from 50 to just 17. The law officially read: "AN ACT REDUCING THE FIFTY-ONE MUNICIPALITIES OF THE PROVINCE OF ILOILO TO SEVENTEEN." This consolidation resulted in the merging of smaller and economically less prosperous towns, including San Joaquin, which was incorporated into the larger and more affluent Miagao.

As a result of this act, many smaller towns were relegated to being suburbs (arrabals) of larger municipalities. Although San Joaquin was now part of Miagao, its identity remained intact, and it continued to serve as an important part of the region’s cultural and historical fabric.

Despite its inclusion in Miagao, the town of San Joaquin did not lose its drive for independence. In 1908, Eliseo J. Sanglap, a prominent native of San Joaquin, was elected Municipal President of Miagao. Sanglap advocated strongly for the restoration of San Joaquin’s autonomy, leading to the passage of Executive Order No. 21 by the American Military Governor General on December 10, 1910. This order officially restored San Joaquin as an independent municipality.

The restoration of San Joaquin was a significant victory for the local people and marked the town’s reclamation of its municipal status after being absorbed into Miagao. With this newfound independence, San Joaquin was able to re-establish its local governance and continue developing under the American colonial system.

=== Separation of Lawigan and Reversion ===
On July 10, 1961, President Carlos P. Garcia issued Executive Order No. 436, which created the municipality of Lawigan in the province of Iloilo, carving it out of several barrios and sitios from San Joaquin. The newly-formed municipality of Lawigan was composed of the following areas: Lawigan, Sinogbuhan, Cataan, Igcundao, Langwanan, San Luis, San Gregorio, Igbangcal, Mabini, Andres Bonifacio, Igcoris, Igbaje, Balabago, Amboyuan, Dacdacanan, Igcabotong, San Mateo, Talagutac, Nagquirisan, Gumawan, and Igdumingding.

The boundary between the two municipalities was defined by the Tiolas River, with the separation starting at its mouth and continuing along the river’s course upstream, passing through the Quianan bridge in Pitogo and along the Iloilo-Antique inter-provincial road up to the provincial boundary at Dawis.

However, the legality of Executive Order No. 436 was challenged by the Municipality of San Joaquin, which argued that the creation of Lawigan was an undue delegation of legislative powers, rendering the order unconstitutional. In G.R. No. L-19870, on March 18, 1967, the Supreme Court ruled in favor of San Joaquin, declaring Executive Order No. 436 null and void ab initio (from the beginning). The Court reasoned that the creation of municipalities is an essentially legislative function, not an administrative one, and that the law violated constitutional principles.

As a result of the ruling, the barrios and sitios that had been part of Lawigan were reverted back to San Joaquin, and Lawigan once again became a part of San Joaquin, Iloilo. The people of Lawigan, however, continued to thrive as part of San Joaquin, with the area remaining a prosperous village and the site of the Our Lady of Salvation Parish.

Currently, San Joaquin is subdivided into 85 barangays, with Lawigan being one of the most prominent, contributing to the town's cultural, religious, and economic life.

== Geography ==
San Joaquin is located at the southern tip of Iloilo Province. One of the rivers that traverse the town is the Siwaragan River, with Barangays Siwaragan and Bucaya situated at its mouth. It is the southernmost municipality in the province, located 53 kilometres (33 mi) from the provincial capital, Iloilo City, and is 44 kilometres (27 mi) from San Jose de Buenavista, the capital of Antique.

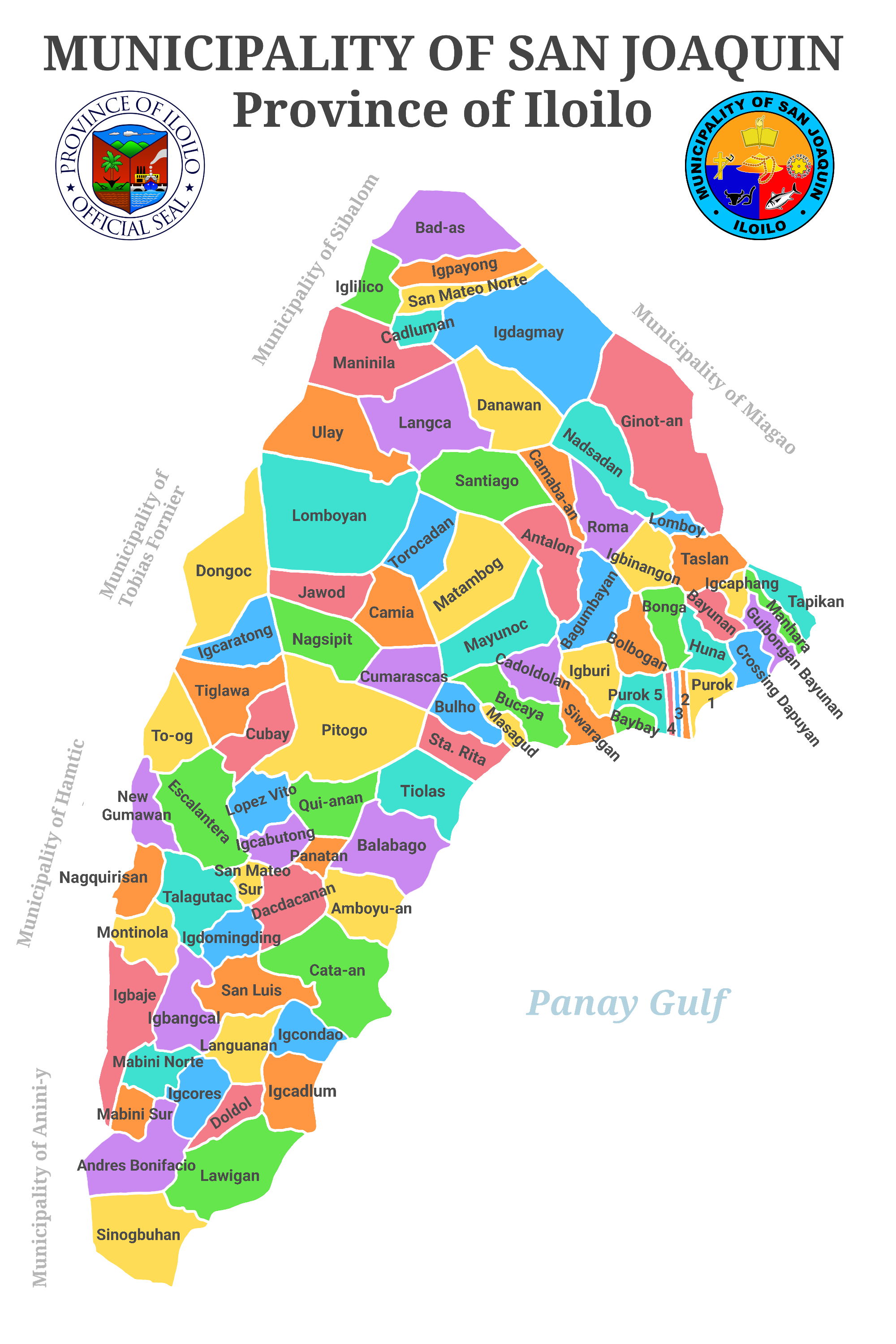
Administrative Map of San Joaquin, Iloilo.

=== Climate ===
Climate data for San Joaquin, Iloilo
Month	Jan	Feb	Mar	Apr	May	Jun	Jul	Aug	Sep	Oct	Nov	Dec	Year
Mean daily maximum °C (°F)	30 (86)	31 (88)	32 (90)	33 (91)	32 (90)	30 (86)	29 (84)	29 (84)	29 (84)	29 (84)	30 (86)	30 (86)	30 (87)
Mean daily minimum °C (°F)	21 (70)	21 (70)	22 (72)	23 (73)	25 (77)	25 (77)	25 (77)	24 (75)	24 (75)	24 (75)	23 (73)	22 (72)	23 (74)
Average precipitation mm (inches)	19 (0.7)	17 (0.7)	26 (1.0)	37 (1.5)	119 (4.7)	191 (7.5)	258 (10.2)	260 (10.2)	248 (9.8)	196 (7.7)	97 (3.8)	39 (1.5)	1,507 (59.3)
Average rainy days	7.2	5.2	8.3	11.9	22.3	26.5	28.3	28.2	27.3	26.4	18.7	11.8	222.1
Source: Meteoblue

=== Barangays ===
San Joaquin is politically subdivided into 85 barangays. Each barangay consists of puroks and some have sitios.

PSGC	Barangay	Population			±% p.a.	
		2024		2010		
063040001	Amboyu-an	2.4%	1,278	1,046	▴	1.41%
063040002	Andres Bonifacio	0.8%	435	468	▾	−0.51%
063040003	Antalon	1.0%	529	530	▾	−0.01%
063040004	Bad-as	0.5%	273	258	▴	0.39%
063040005	Bagumbayan	1.4%	731	599	▴	1.40%
063040006	Balabago	2.4%	1,270	1,139	▴	0.76%
063040007	Baybay	1.9%	1,003	756	▴	1.99%
063040008	Bayunan (Panday Oro)	1.2%	651	674	▾	−0.24%
063040010	Bolbogan	0.8%	448	389	▴	0.99%
063040011	Bulho	1.0%	516	454	▴	0.90%
063040012	Bucaya	3.3%	1,732	1,691	▴	0.17%
063040013	Cadluman	0.4%	207	198	▴	0.31%
063040014	Cadoldolan	0.9%	491	408	▴	1.30%
063040015	Camia	0.7%	392	364	▴	0.52%
063040016	Camaba-an	0.5%	251	251	Steady	0.00%
063040017	Cata-an	2.4%	1,276	1,256	▴	0.11%
063040018	Crossing Dapuyan	1.8%	939	976	▾	−0.27%
063040019	Cubay	0.7%	385	456	▾	−1.17%
063040020	Cumarascas	0.5%	257	257	Steady	0.00%
063040021	Dacdacanan	0.8%	420	491	▾	−1.08%
063040022	Danawan	0.6%	302	319	▾	−0.38%
063040024	Doldol	0.9%	454	429	▴	0.40%
063040025	Dongoc	1.8%	936	692	▴	2.13%
063040026	Escalantera (Dawis)	1.7%	892	795	▴	0.81%
063040027	Ginot-an	1.5%	794	832	▾	−0.33%
063040029	Huna	0.5%	281	209	▴	2.08%
063040030	Igbaje	0.5%	262	323	▾	−1.45%
063040031	Igbangcal	0.6%	332	467	▾	−2.35%
063040032	Igbinangon	0.5%	286	231	▴	1.50%
063040033	Igburi	1.0%	529	479	▴	0.69%
063040034	Igcabutong	0.3%	184	247	▾	−2.03%
063040035	Igcadlum	1.0%	554	485	▴	0.93%
063040036	Igcaphang	0.3%	159	168	▾	−0.38%
063040037	Igcaratong	1.1%	574	695	▾	−1.32%
063040038	Igcondao	0.7%	366	451	▾	−1.44%
063040039	Igcores	1.1%	558	462	▴	1.32%
063040040	Igdagmay	0.4%	196	198	▾	−0.07%
063040041	Igdomingding	0.4%	199	214	▾	−0.50%
063040042	Iglilico	0.5%	256	293	▾	−0.94%
063040043	Igpayong	0.3%	144	125	▴	0.99%
063040044	Jawod	1.1%	591	533	▴	0.72%
063040045	Langca	0.7%	388	483	▾	−1.51%
063040046	Languanan	0.5%	283	372	▾	−1.89%
063040047	Lawigan	5.3%	2,780	2,670	▴	0.28%
063040048	Lomboy	0.7%	349	339	▴	0.20%
063040049	Lopez Vito (San Pedro)	0.8%	396	554	▾	−2.31%
063040050	Mabini Norte	0.5%	275	317	▾	−0.99%
063040051	Mabini Sur	0.7%	393	491	▾	−1.54%
063040053	Manhara	0.6%	305	281	▴	0.57%
063040054	Maninila	0.3%	176	217	▾	−1.45%
063040055	Masagud	1.2%	630	549	▴	0.96%
063040056	Matambog	1.3%	664	649	▴	0.16%
063040057	Mayunoc	0.6%	295	339	▾	−0.96%
063040058	Montinola (San Gregorio)	0.8%	401	521	▾	−1.81%
063040059	Nagquirisan	0.3%	177	301	▾	−3.63%
063040060	Nadsadan	0.7%	354	397	▾	−0.80%
063040061	Nagsipit	1.1%	581	486	▴	1.25%
063040062	New Gumawan	0.6%	319	360	▾	−0.84%
063040063	Panatan	0.3%	144	161	▾	−0.77%
063040064	Pitogo	3.3%	1,753	1,573	▴	0.76%
063040065	Purok 1 (Poblacion)	2.8%	1,455	1,337	▴	0.59%
063040066	Purok 2 (Poblacion)	1.5%	812	928	▾	−0.93%
063040067	Purok 3 (Poblacion)	0.6%	335	517	▾	−2.98%
063040068	Purok 4 (Poblacion)	1.4%	717	943	▾	−1.89%
063040069	Purok 5 (Poblacion)	3.1%	1,651	1,420	▴	1.06%
063040070	Qui-anan	1.4%	737	606	▴	1.37%
063040071	Roma	0.9%	501	519	▾	−0.25%
063040072	San Luis	1.2%	609	594	▴	0.17%
063040073	San Mateo Norte	0.3%	182	201	▾	−0.69%
063040074	San Mateo Sur	0.3%	134	182	▾	−2.11%
063040075	Santiago	0.2%	129	163	▾	−1.62%
063040076	Sinogbuhan	3.4%	1,772	1,637	▴	0.55%
063040077	Siwaragan	3.4%	1,814	1,657	▴	0.63%
063040078	Lomboyan (Santa Ana)	1.0%	525	497	▴	0.38%
063040079	Santa Rita	3.6%	1,898	1,765	▴	0.51%
063040080	Talagutac	0.6%	320	434	▾	−2.10%
063040081	Tapikan	0.9%	451	330	▴	2.20%
063040082	Taslan	1.3%	664	654	▴	0.11%
063040083	Tiglawa	1.1%	596	676	▾	−0.87%
063040084	Tiolas	3.6%	1,910	1,897	▴	0.05%
063040085	To-og	1.4%	723	484	▴	2.84%
063040088	Torocadan	0.4%	209	266	▾	−1.67%
063040087	Ulay	0.8%	412	409	▴	0.05%
063040088	Bonga	0.9%	501	468	▴	0.48%
063040089	Guibongan Bayunan	1.4%	720	632	▴	0.91%
	Total		52,773	51,645	▴	0.15%

== Demographics ==
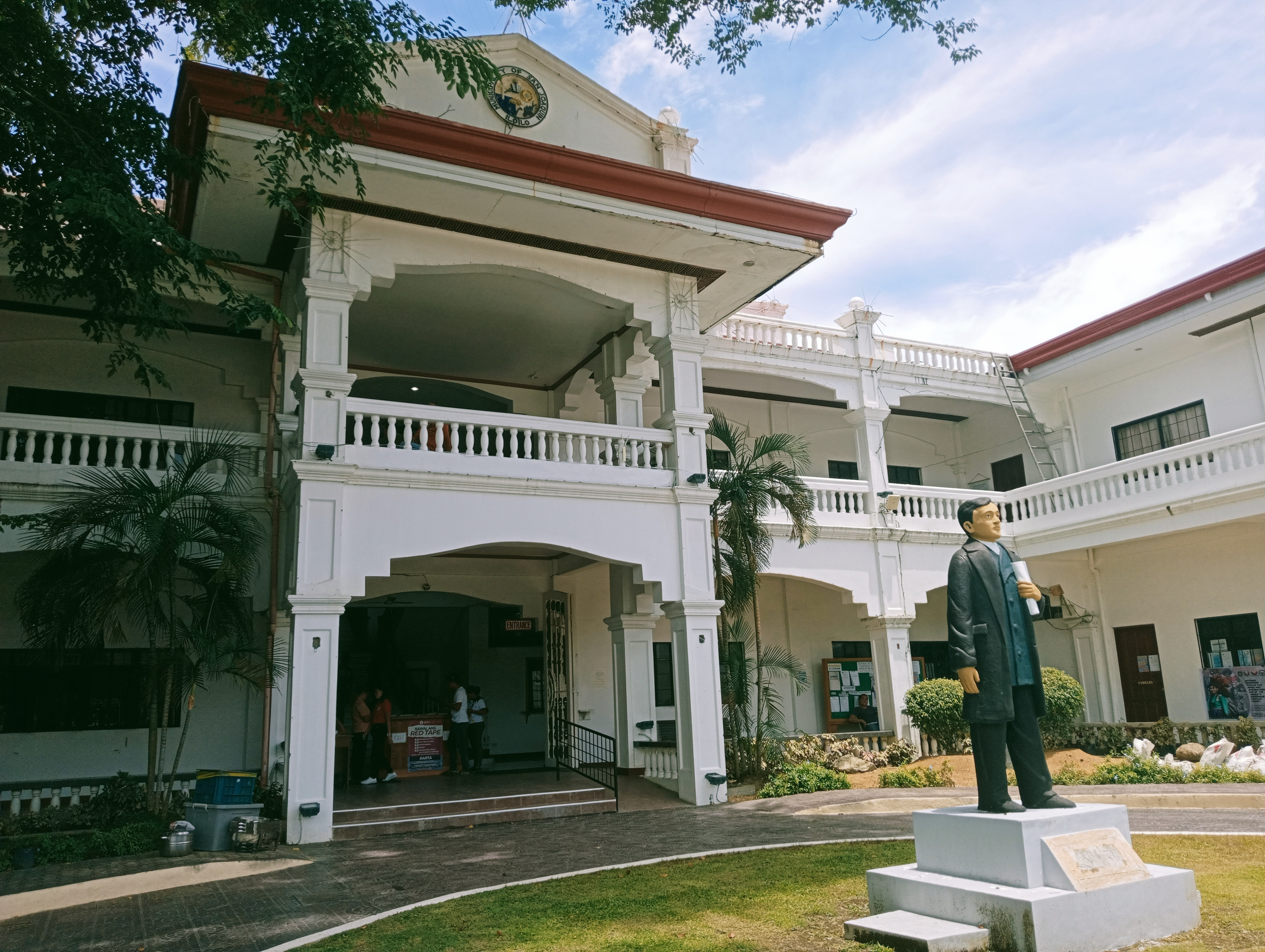
San Joaquin People's Center

Population census of San Joaquin
Year	Pop.	±% p.a.
1903	14,333	—
1918	17,834	+1.47%
1939	23,779	+1.38%
1948	22,255	−0.73%
1960	24,655	+0.86%
1970	29,610	+1.85%
1975	32,352	+1.79%
1980	34,525	+1.31%
1990	39,958	+1.47%
1995	44,368	+1.98%
2000	47,826	+1.62%
2007	50,102	+0.64%
2010	51,645	+1.11%
2015	51,892	+0.09%
2020	52,617	+0.29%
2024	52,773	+0.07%
Source: Philippine Statistics Authority

In the 2024 census, the population of San Joaquin, Iloilo, was 52,773 people, with a density of 220 inhabitants per square kilometre or 570 inhabitants per square mile.

=== Languages ===
Kinaray-a is the main language of San Joaquin. Hiligaynon is spoken as a secondary language and is also understood by the residents.

=== Religion ===
Religious Affiliation (2020)
Religion	Adherents
Roman Catholic	51,163
Protestant	826
Iglesia ni Cristo	234
Latter-day Saints	125
Others	247
None	1
Not Reported	21

San Joaquin is predominantly Roman Catholic, with approximately 97% of the population adhering to the faith. Other Christian denominations are also present, including Independent Catholic churches such as the Iglesia Filipina Independiente (Aglipayan Church), and various Protestant groups such as Baptists, Presbyterians, Methodists, Seventh-day Adventists, and other Evangelical Christians.

Non-Protestant Christian groups also have a presence in the municipality, including the Iglesia ni Cristo, the Church of Jesus Christ of Latter-day Saints (Mormons), and Jehovah's Witnesses.

A small portion of the population practices non-Christian religions, with Islam being the most commonly represented among them.

== Economy ==
San Joaquin’s economy is predominantly based on agriculture, fishing, and local commerce. The municipality’s fertile lands support the cultivation of crops such as rice, sugarcane, corn, and vegetables, which provide livelihoods for many residents. Fishing is also an important economic activity due to the municipality’s coastal location. Small businesses and retail establishments contribute to the local economy, while tourism is gradually developing with the promotion of natural and cultural attractions.

=== Poverty Incidence ===
The poverty incidence in San Joaquin has significantly decreased over the past two decades.

Poverty incidence of San Joaquin

Source: Philippine Statistics Authority

The general downward trend reflects the positive effects of economic development efforts and poverty reduction programs in the municipality. However, there were slight increases in poverty incidence in 2009 and 2021. The rise in 2009 is likely connected to the 2008–2009 global financial crisis, which affected economies worldwide and to the impact of Typhoon Frank, which caused significant damage in the region. Meanwhile, the increase in 2021 is attributed to the economic disruptions caused by the COVID-19 pandemic.

== Landmarks ==
=== San Joaquin Church ===
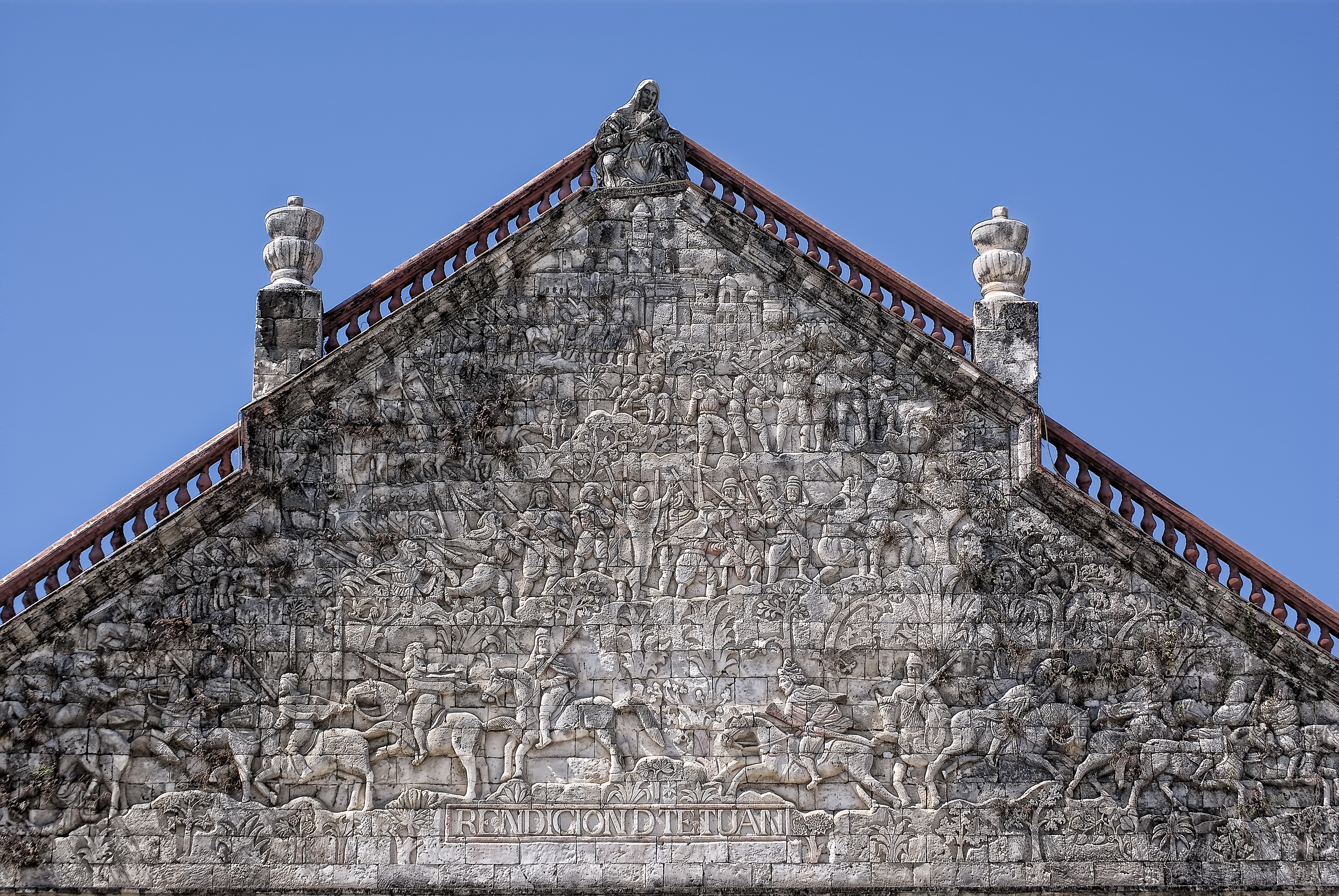
The pediment of San Joaquin Church featuring the Battle of Tetuan

The main church in town, a Roman Catholic parish was constructed in 1859 and completed in 1869 by Spanish friar Tomas Santaren, of the Augustinian Order. The church is unique among those in the Philippines for its large pediment featuring a military scene, the Spanish victory over the Moors in the Battle of Tetuan. The National Museum of the Philippines listed the church as a National Cultural Treasure.

=== San Joaquin Cemetery ===
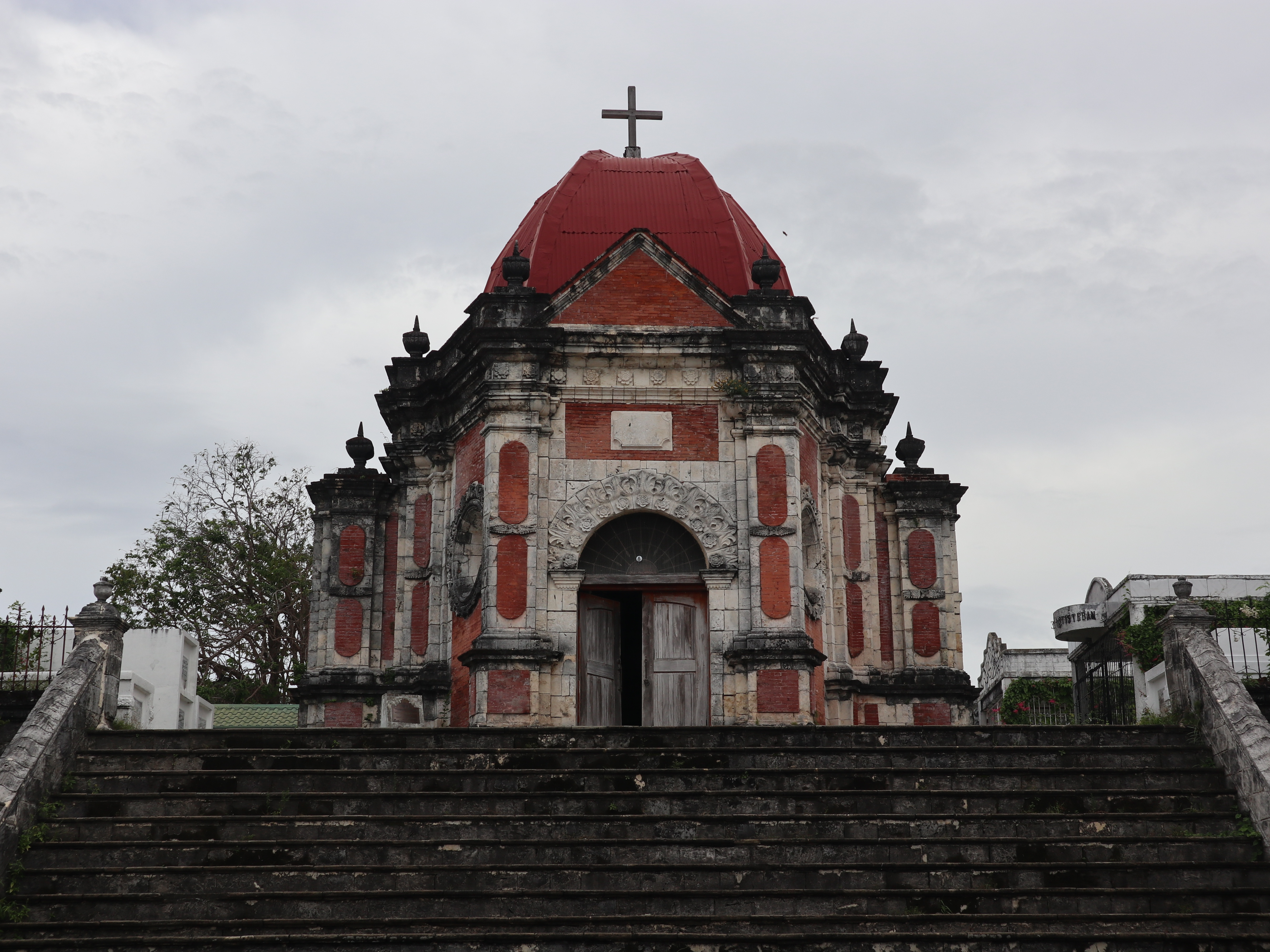
San Joaquin Campo Santo

The San Joaquin Cemetery is located along the main highway in San Joaquin Town. The construction of San Joaquin Cemetery was commenced by Fray Mariano Vamba, the last Augustinian parish priest of the town in 1892. A statue of Jesus with his arms outstretched stands on top of a baroque style gate, and on each side of Christ, two columns with angelic figures are poised as guards. In addition, sculpted heads of two cherubs and a skull representing death marks the entrance of the cemetery. Twenty stone steps after entering the gate and you will be greeted by the Baroque designed mortuary chapel standing on the center.

== Culture ==
The Bayluhay Festival, celebrated every third week of January, reflects the town's unique mixture of races and cultures. Historical and religious themes, mostly anchored from the Barter of Panay, such as efforts with the preservation of rituals, are reflected through the dances presented in the festivity. Accentuated every annual municipal fiesta is the “Pasungay” or bull fight. During this affair, the best bulls from the different barangays are pitted against each other by weight category in a “bull derby”.

== Tourism ==
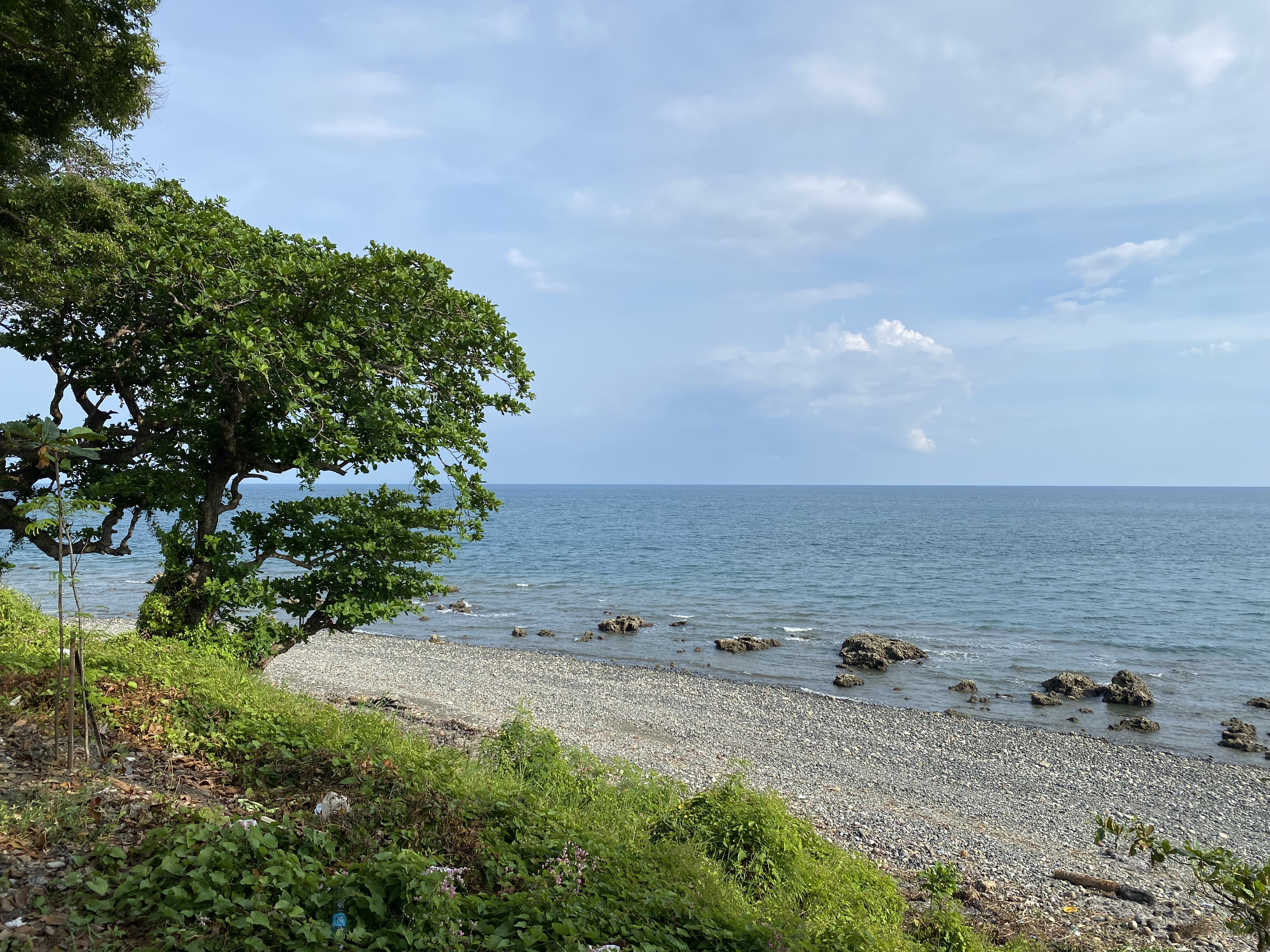
San Joaquin coastline near the town center

The Talisayan Beach Resort is a privately owned beach resort located in the Poblacion. The Cata-an Cove and Tobog Beach Resort in Barangay Cata-an, about 10 kilometers from the Poblacion, is a place perfect for scuba diving and weekend outings. Garin Farm, a 15 hectare privately owned farm resort in Purok 2, Poblacion which showcases agriculture, leisure and pilgrimage theme. Practical and intelligent farming are imparted to the visitors through the agricultural techniques and innovative technologies applied in the demo farm. The resort leisure amenities include a swimming pool, a 5,000 sq.m man-made lagoon located on a hilltop, with fishes and lilies which offers fishing, boating and kayaking, and a 300 meters zip line which goes over the lagoon and through the trees. On the top of the hill sits the 101 Feet Divine Mercy Cross, which can be accessed by a 456 step stairway. Along the stairway are life-size and lifelike statues depicting the Creation, Noah's Ark, Ten Commandments, and the 9 Major Events of the Life of Jesus Christ.

== Infrastructure ==
=== Healthcare ===
The San Joaquin Mother and Child Hospital (SJMCH), is a publicly managed, district-level hospital located in Barangay Baybay, San Joaquin, Iloilo. It operates 24 hours daily under the leadership of Dr. Rodel G. Gedalanga, MD, FPCP, who serves as Chief of Hospital I.

It was inaugurated in April 2013 and initially operated under the supervision of the Western Visayas Medical Center (WVMC) and the municipal government. In 2019, Iloilo Governor Arthur Defensor Sr. signed Provincial Ordinance No. 2018‑191 converting SJMCH into the 13th district hospital under the Iloilo Provincial Government’s Hospital Management Office.

The hospital is a primary-care facility with a 10‑bed capacity, serving maternal, neonatal, pediatric, and basic outpatient needs of residents in San Joaquin and neighboring municipalities. The provincial government allocated PHP 43 million in 2019 for its full integration into the district hospital network, covering operations, staffing, and equipment.

In June 2023, the Iloilo Provincial Board passed a resolution urging the Department of Health to upgrade SJMCH’s license from a 10-bed infirmary to a 25-bed Level I General Hospital. This upgrade reflects the hospital’s expanded services, which now include an emergency room, clinical laboratory, imaging facilities, pharmacy, and an operating room.

Additionally, in mid‑2024, a joint legislative committee confirmed that the land on which the hospital stands is government‑owned, ensuring uninterrupted operations and preventing any claims of donation revocation being enforced.

In June 2025, a formal inter‑LGU partnership was approved between Iloilo Province and the Municipality of Anini-y, Antique to accept referrals for maternal and child health services at SJMCH, in line with Section 16 and Section 465 of Republic Act 7160, or the Local Government Code of 1991.

== Education ==
The town has 11 high schools.

- Don Felix Serra National High School (formerly San Joaquin High School)
- San Joaquin School of Fisheries
- Sta. Ana National High School
- Tiolas National High School
- Lawigan National High School
- Valverde National High School
- Escalantera National High School
- Sinogbuhan National High School
- Bad-as National High School
- Ginot-an National High School
- Pitogo National High School
