= San Joaquin Campo Santo =

Roman Catholic cemetery in Iloilo, Philippines

San Joaquín Campo Santo
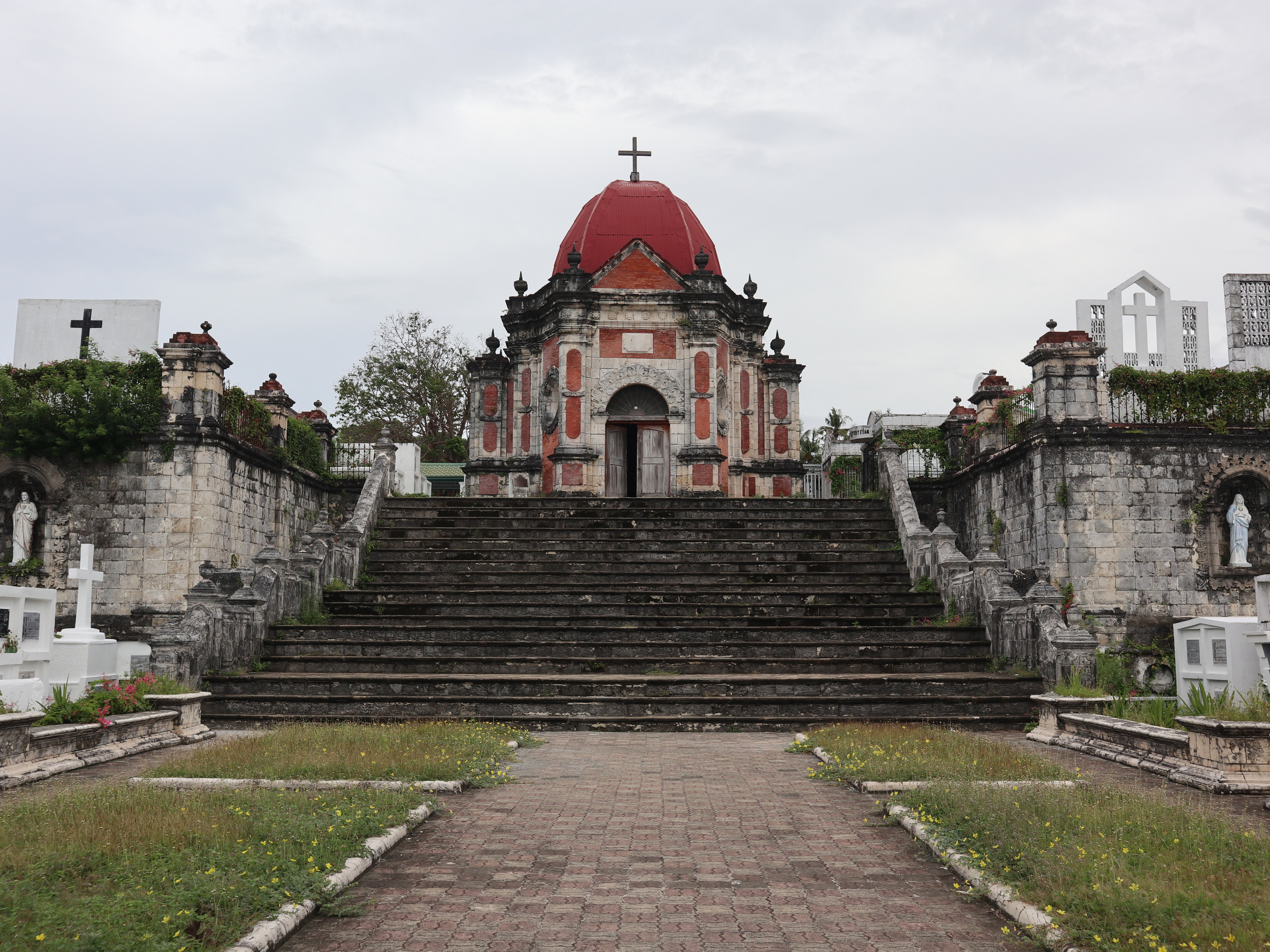
- Façade and steps of the mortuary chapel
- Interactive map of San Joaquín Campo Santo

Details
- Established: 1892
- Location: San Joaquín, Iloilo
- Country: Philippines
- Coordinates: 10°35′34″N 122°08′42″E
- Type: Roman Catholic
- Style: Spanish Baroque
- Owned by: Archdiocese of Jaro

The San Joaquin Campo Santo is a Roman Catholic cemetery in the town of San Joaquín in Iloilo, Philippines. It is a designated as a National Cultural Treasure by the National Museum of the Philippines, together with San Joaquín Church.

The graveyard complex is under the jurisdiction of the Archdiocese of Jaro.

== History ==
In 1892, the cemetery was established by Augustinian priest, Mariano Vamba. It was declared a National Cultural Treasure in December 2015 by the National Museum of the Philippines and in August 2016 a marker was placed at the site to indicate this designation. The park, along with the San Joaquín Church, are known as the "San Joaquin Church Complex and Campo Santo of San Joaquin, Iloilo".

The Department of Public Works and Highways plans of a road widening project which would affect a portion of the cemetery's perimeter received nationwide attention in May 2015, but no part of the cemetery's walls was demolished following an appeal by local officials to the then-Department of Transportation and Communication.

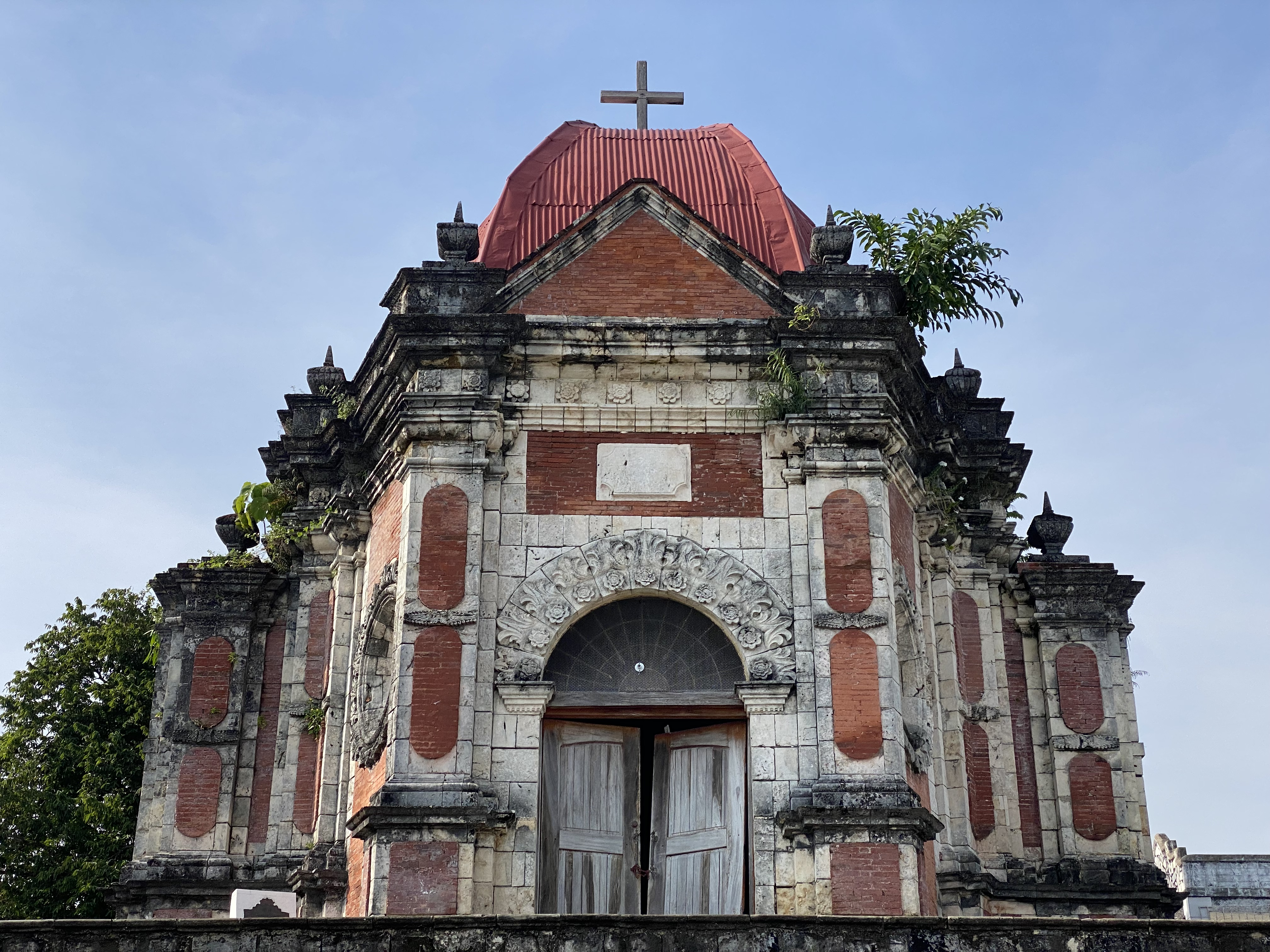
Facade of the mortuary chapel

A 60 feet (18 m) pit was dug inside the cemetery’s Spanish Baroque mortuary chapel by treasure hunters, compromising the integrity of the structure. The digging reportedly had the authorization of the parish priest of San Joaquín, and began as early as December 2015. The parish priest, who took a leave of absence, was replaced by the Archdiocese of Jaro.

A restoration effort finished in November 2016, wherein the pit was filled with a proper mixture of soil, rock, and cement initiated by the Archdiocese of Jaro, through the Parish Administrator delegated by the Archbishop of Jaro.
