= Boyce (surname) =

Boyce is a surname. Notable people with the surname include:

- Adolphe Lippig Boyce (1866–1955), American militia leader
- Ann Boyce (1827–1914), New Zealand pioneer and herbalist
- Cameron Boyce (1999–2019), American actor
- Cameron Boyce (cricketer) (born 1989), Australian cricketer
- Carla Boyce (born 1998), Scottish footballer
- Charles Boyce (born 1949), American cartoonist
- Charles Boyce (footballer) (1899–1964), Scottish footballer
- Christopher John Boyce (born 1953), American who sold spy satellite secrets to the USSR
- Darryl Boyce (born 1984), Canadian ice hockey player with the Toronto Marlies of the AHL
- Emmerson Boyce (born 1979), English footballer
- Ethel Boyce (1917–1996), Canadian player in the All-American Girls Professional Baseball League
- Ethel Mary Boyce (1863–1936), English composer, pianist and teacher
- Francis Bertie Boyce "Archdeacon Boyce" (1844–1931), Australian social reformer
- Francis Stewart Boyce (1872–1940), his son, Australian politician and judge
- Frank Cottrell-Boyce (born 1959), British writer
- Frank M. Boyce (1851–1931), New York politician
- George Boyce (disambiguation), several people, including

- D. G. Boyce (D. George Boyce, 1942–2020), Northern Irish historian
- George Boyce (Canadian politician) (1848–1930), Unionist MP for Carleton, 1917–1921
- George Price Boyce (1826–1897), British watercolor painter
- George W. G. Boyce Jr. (died 1944), United States Army officer and Medal of Honor recipient

- James Boyce (disambiguation), several people including:

- James Boyce (Louisiana politician) (1922–1990), American politician
- James A. Boyce, Scottish-American businessman
- James F. Boyce (1868–1935), American industrial chemist
- James Petigru Boyce (1827–1888), theologian and Southern Seminary founder

- Jill Boyce, American video engineer
- Kevin Boyce (born 1971), American politician, Ohio State Treasurer
- Lionel Boyce (born 1991), American actor, writer, producer, and former musician
- Lola Boyce (born 1944), American mechanical engineer
- Martin Boyce (born 1967), Scottish sculptor
- Mary Boyce (1920–2006), British scholar of Iranian languages and authority on Zoroastrianism
- Mary Cunningham Boyce, American academic and engineer
- Max Boyce (born 1943), Welsh singer and comedian
- Michael Boyce (disambiguation), several people:

- Michael Boyce (field hockey) (born 1980), Australian field hockey player
- Michael Boyce, Baron Boyce (1943–2022), First Sea Lord of the Royal Navy and Chief of Defence Staff

- Minnie Thomas Boyce (1870–1929), American writer
- Philip Boyce (disambiguation), several people
- Raymond Boyce (disambiguation), several people
- Ronnie Boyce (1943–2025), English footballer
- Samuel Boyce (died 1775), dramatist and poet
- Sonia Boyce (born 1962), British Afro-Caribbean artist and educator
- Sue Boyce (born 1951), Australian politician, businesswoman and disability advocate
- Todd Boyce (born 1961), Anglo-American actor
- Tommy Boyce (1939–1994), of the American songwriters Boyce and Hart
- William Boyce (disambiguation), several people, including:

- William Boyce (composer) (1711–1779), English-born composer and Master of the King's Musick
- William Binnington Boyce (1804–1889), English-born philologist and clergyman, active in Australia
- William D. Boyce (1858–1929), founder of the Boy Scouts of America
- William H. Boyce (1855–1942), jurist and U.S. representative from Delaware
- William Waters Boyce (1818–1890), U.S. Confederate congressional delegate

== See also ==
- Boice, surname
