= Battle of Driniumor River =

World War II battle in New Guinea

- Part of the New Guinea campaign
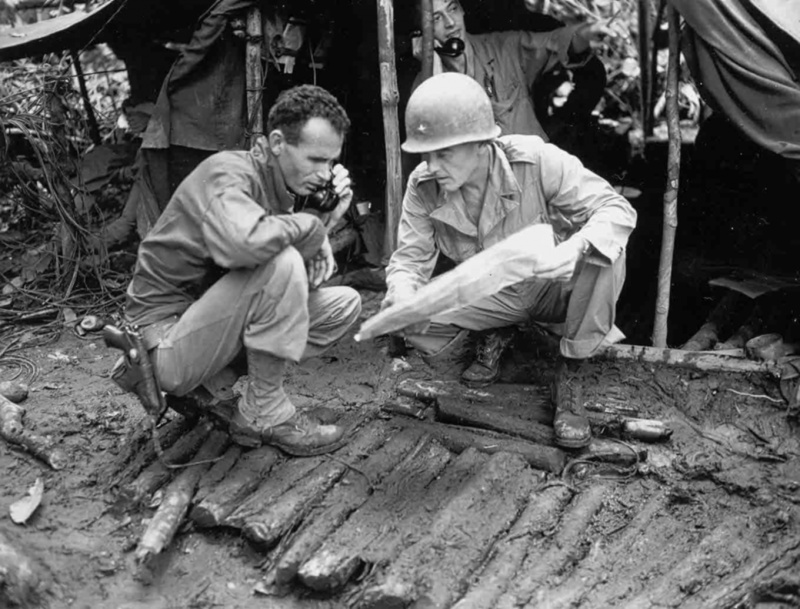
- Brig. Gen. Julian Cunningham (right), the CO of the 112th Cavalry Regiment, reviews a map at a command post near Driniumor River on 9 August 1944.
Date	10 July – 25 August 1944
Location	Near Aitape, Territory of New Guinea 3°08′00″S 142°21′00″E
Result	Allied victory

Belligerents
United States; Australia	Japan

Commanders and leaders
(United States) Walter Krueger (United States) Charles P. Hall (United States) William H. Gill (United States) Clarence A. Martin (United States) Julian W. Cunningham	(Empire of Japan) Hatazō Adachi

Units involved
XI Corps: 31st Infantry Division (incomplete); 32nd Infantry Division; 43rd Infantry Division	18th Army: 20th Division; 41st Division

Strength
	~ 20,000

Casualties and losses
440 killed 2,550 wounded 10 missing	8,000–10,000

The Battle of Driniumor River, also known as the Battle of Aitape, 10 July – 25 August 1944, was part of the Western New Guinea campaign of World War II. During the fighting, Japanese forces launched several attacks on United States forces on the Driniumor River, near Aitape in New Guinea, over the course of several weeks with the intention of retaking Aitape. After making some initial gains, the Japanese attack was contained and eventually turned back having suffered heavy casualties. The battle should not be confused with Operation Persecution, which included amphibious landings near Aitape in April 1944, or the Aitape–Wewak campaign, which began in November that year.

== Background ==
The Driniumor River lies approximately 20 mi (32 km) east of Aitape on the north coast of what was part of the Territory of New Guinea at the time of the battle. During 1942 the Japanese had occupied much of New Guinea, but throughout 1943 the Allies had slowly gained the ascendency. By early 1944, the Allies had begun a series of landings along the northern and western New Guinea coast as part of the advance towards the Philippines. On 22 April 1944, Allied forces landed at several key points around Hollandia and seized Aitape as part of Operations Reckless and Persecution. In the process, they cut off the Japanese 18th Army, which was retreating westwards toward the Japanese Second Area Army in Dutch New Guinea and bypassed strong Japanese positions around Wewak and Hansa Bay. After the seizure of Aitape, the U.S. 163rd Regimental Combat Team (163rd RCT) consolidated their positions until early May when they were relieved by the 32nd Infantry Division under Major general William H. Gill. A defensive perimeter was established around the airfields in the area, eventually extending 30 miles (48 km) east of Aitape, including several outposts along the Dandriwad River. From these positions, U.S. troops undertook patrols to locate the Japanese troops in the area, which were centered around Wewak, about 90 miles (140 km) from Aitape, to the southeast.

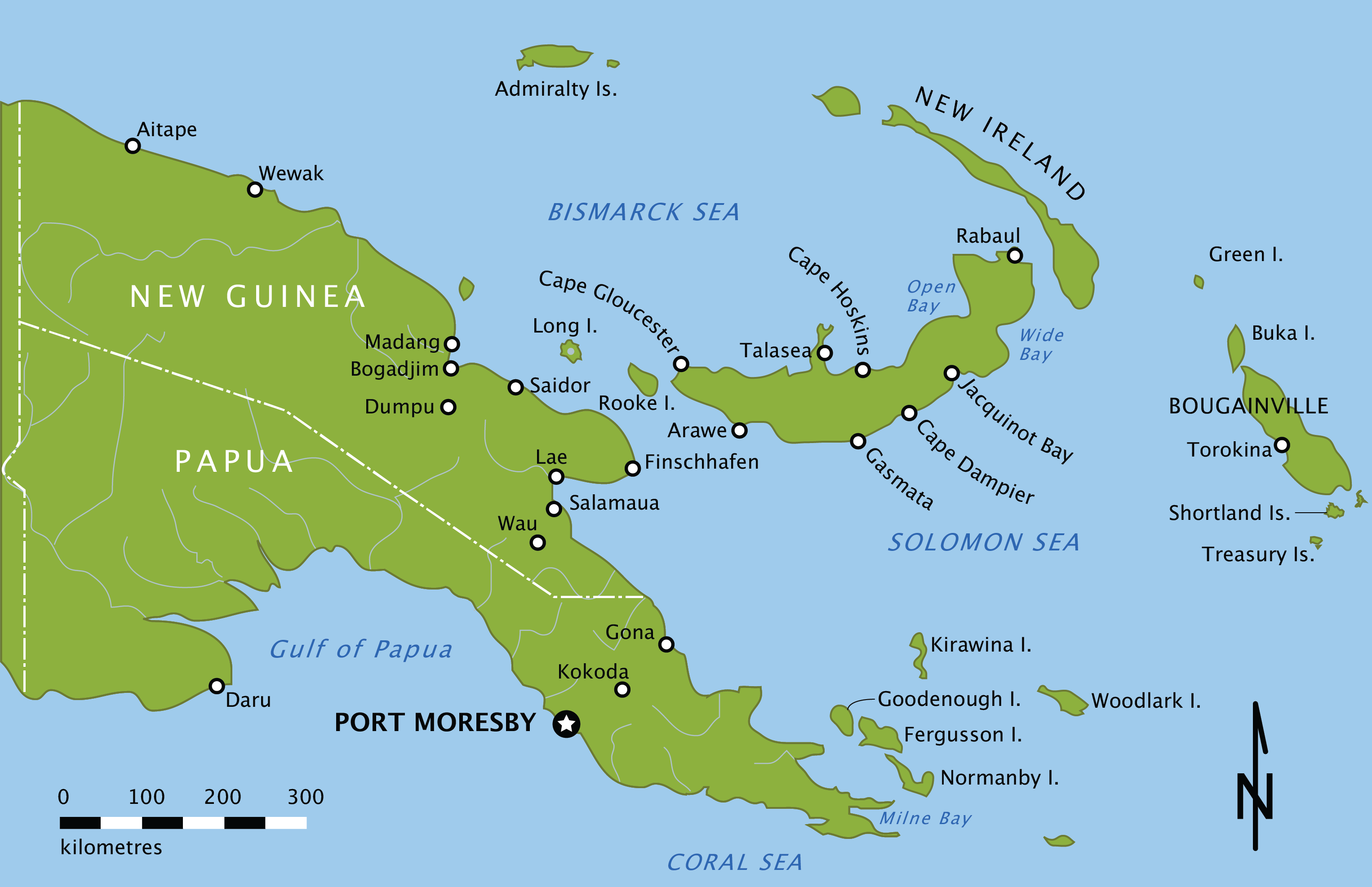
Location of New Guinea, including Aitape

The Japanese troops holding the area were drawn from the 18th Army. This force had suffered severe losses in the Lae, Huon Peninsula and Finisterre Range campaigns and had not been reinforced. Under the command of Lieutenant-General Hatazō Adachi, the force consisted of around 20,000 troops; its main fighting units were the 20th and the 41st Divisions. One regiment, the 66th, from the 51st Division was also attached to reinforce the 20th Division. Intelligence derived from codebreaking as well as captured documents, Allied Intelligence Bureau patrols, and other sources indicated that the Japanese 18th Army was approaching the Driniumor (referred to by the Japanese the Hanto) with the intention of breaking through the Allied line and retaking Aitape. In the lead up to the battle, the Japanese established their westward supply lines, constructing a 60 km (37 mi) road from Wewak and installed a series of coastal defenses to protect water transportation operations. Nevertheless, supplies had to be manhandled forward from But by almost 7,000 troops. The 18th Army had only half the ammunition Japanese logistics manuals specified as being needed for a major battle as of early June, and its soldiers were receiving half the usual rations.

As early as late May, General Walter Krueger ordered reinforcements into the area in response to a range of intelligence about the Japanese buildup. In late June, the Allies began moving the 43rd Infantry Division from New Zealand, and the 112th Cavalry Regiment and 124th Infantry Regiment (the latter from the 31st Infantry Division) arrived from eastern New Guinea. Throughout late May, Japanese troops closed on the U.S. outposts along the Dandriwad and after a series of clashes, in early June Adachi's troops had forced the Americans to withdraw from the Yakamul area and rejoin the main body of troops along the Driniumor. By late June, Allied forces in the area had been built up to corps strength, and XI Corps commander, Major General Charles P. Hall had established his headquarters at Aitape. Around this time, a covering force under Brigadier general Clarence A. Martin, built around the 112th Cavalry Regimental Combat Team with Brigadier General Julian W. Cunningham in command, was sent approximately 20 miles (32 km) east to guard Aitape's eastern flank on the line of Driniumor River.

Despite these preparations, the Allied intelligence picture was confusing and contradictory. In the lead up to the attack, Allied patrols were unable to locate the Japanese troop concentrations throughout early July. Both Hall and General Douglas MacArthur's chief of intelligence, Brigadier General Charles A. Willoughby, believed during June that the Japanese were incapable of conducting an attack. While they had access to decoded Japanese radio messages which indicated that such an attack was imminent, both men regarded this as unlikely given that other Japanese messages also revealed the 18th Army's desperate logistical situation. Further intelligence, including information gained from fighting patrols, led to American troops being placed on alert in expectation of a Japanese assault on several occasions in late June and early July. No attack eventuated, as the Japanese had been forced to delay the operation. When the attack began the Americans were taken by surprise.

== Battle ==
On the night of 10/11 July, an assault force of around 10,000 Japanese attacked en masse across the Driniumor. In support of this effort, they moved several 70 mm and 75 mm artillery pieces forward through the jungle. The Japanese attack plan had envisaged three regiments—the 78th, 80th and the 237th—attacking simultaneously in a contiguous line abreast, on a front between Paup and Afua. Following a five-minute artillery bombardment, the attack began at 22:55 hours on 10 July. The initial attack was poorly coordinated, being hampered by the terrain, which resulted in the 78th launching their assault 20 minutes before the 80th who were followed by the main elements of the 237th around 02:00 hours on 11 July. By 03:00 hours, the assault petered out, having gained about 1,300 yards (1,200 m). A secondary attack began at around 05:00 hours when follow on elements of the Japanese 237th Infantry Regiment, along with supporting medical, staff and artillery personnel crossed the Driniumor. This secondary movement continued until around dawn when elements of the two main Japanese assault regiments—the 78th and 80th—began reorganising on high ground about 800 yards (730 m) northwest of the U.S. line. The 237th, whose commander, Colonel Nara, had become separated from his headquarters, took longer to reorganize.

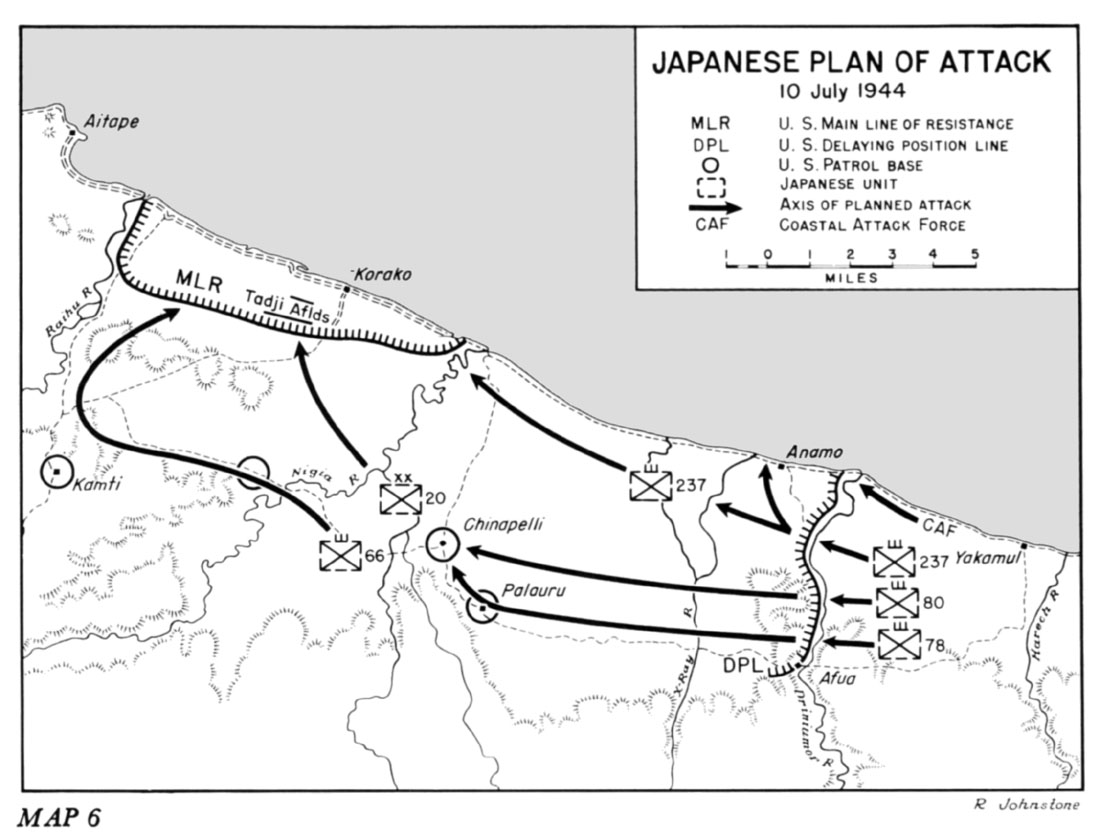
Map depicting the planned Japanese scheme of maneuver for 10 July

Against the combined efforts of the three assaulting Japanese regiments, Companies E and G of the U.S. 128th Infantry Regiment bore the brunt of the assault on 10–11 July. They were supported by heavy machine gun and mortar fire, as well as indirect fire from the 120th and 129th Field Artillery Battalions, positioned in support along the eastern bank of the Driniumor. This inflicted heavy casualties on the Japanese and destroyed large amounts of equipment including machine guns and indirect fire support weapons. Company G was largely able to hold its positions, anchored on the right by a supporting battalion from the 127th Infantry Regiment, but Company E's line in the center collapsed under the pressure. At least 30 members of the company were killed or wounded, although some of the survivors, along with supporting detachments from Company H, were able to withdraw to Company F's lines on the U.S. left flank near the coast. Others remained behind Japanese lines for at least three days.

Despite heavy casualties, the Japanese troops in the initial assault pressed on and forced a major breach in the American line. In response, U.S. forces began withdrawing to delaying positions throughout 11–12 July in an effort to prevent further Japanese advances. During the initial assault, the Japanese had succeeded in pushing through the center of the U.S. line, forcing a withdrawal about 3 miles (4.8 km) west to an area around Koronal Creek and X-ray River; however, they were unable to take full advantage of the initial success due to supply and communications problems. In response, U.S. commanders ordered a counterattack and throughout 13–14 July, U.S. forces worked to restore their line, closing a gap that had developed between the northern and southern forces. In support of the U.S. counterattack, at least three field artillery battalions of 105 mm howitzers (the 120th, 129th and 149th) were committed, including one from the 31st Infantry Division (the 149th); of these the 129th and 149th were allocated to the northern force, while the 120th fired in support of the southern force. These fires were augmented across the front by one battalion of 155 mm guns (the 181st). After a fighting withdrawal through the jungle that night, the U.S. defenders managed to regroup where possible and by the 13th were counterattacking to try to seal the breach. In support of this, two battalions of the U.S. 124th Infantry Regiment were committed to the fighting, disrupting the Japanese 237th Infantry Regiment's investment of the Paup villages, and resulting in further clashes around Tiver.

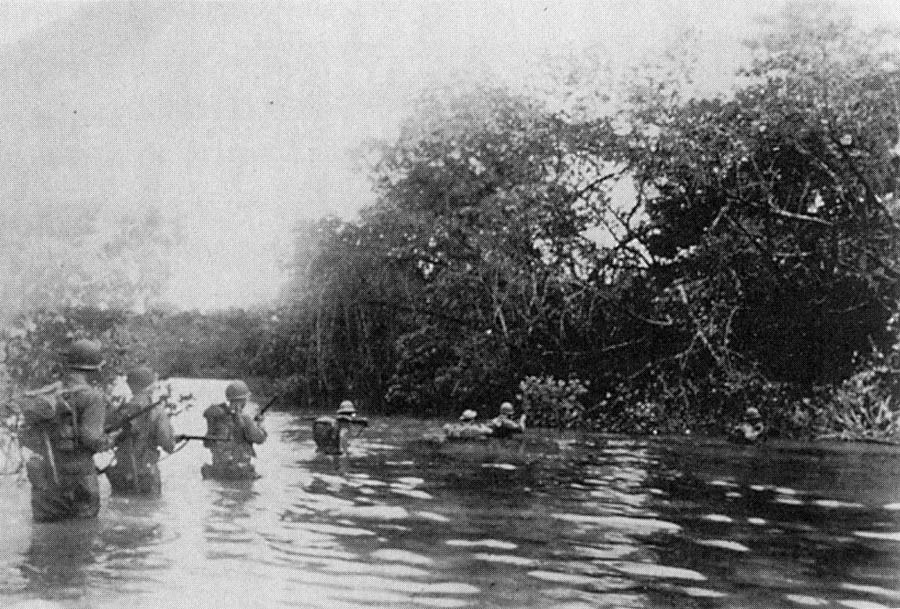
U.S. troops patrol along a river during the battle

The Japanese prepared a renewed attack by elements of the 20th Division northwest of Afua, commencing around 15–16 July. This effort resulted in heavy clashes with elements of the U.S. 112th Cavalry and 127th Infantry Regiments on the southern flank of the Allied line, but failed to permanently secure the village for the Japanese who captured it at least twice, before being forced to withdraw. After the first effort against Afua, the remainder of July saw heavy fighting west of the river as platoon/troop, company/squadron and battalion-sized units clashed in the jungle along the coast and around the Torricelli Mountains. As the fighting devolved into hand-to-hand combat in the jungle, heavy pressure was maintained upon some pockets of American troops still clinging to their positions at the river as they became encircled by Japanese troops who were determined on wiping them out and securing the Afua area. By 22 July, the Japanese had captured Afua, but the following day reinforcements from the U.S. 127th Infantry Regiment began relieving the isolated cavalrymen. In response, the Japanese commander, Adachi, decided to launch another effort around Afua, committing his reserve regiment, the 66th, and the bulk of the 41st Division to an all out attack alongside the 20th Division. Commencing on 29 July, and spanning several days, the attack captured some ground, but resulted in heavy Japanese casualties.

Meanwhile, U.S. forces began preparing to launch a counteroffensive around 29–31 July. This effort aimed to outflank the Japanese forces attacking around Afua with elements of the 124th and 169th Infantry Regiments pushing east of the Driniumor from the north of the Allied line near the coast, advancing to Niumen Creek before turning south and then west to envelop the Japanese forces attacking the U.S. southern flank. By the beginning of August, the Japanese drive against Afua had petered out and they were eventually pushed back east over the Driniumor. The Japanese forces on their right flank near the coast then switched to the defensive, offering strong resistance before attempting to resupply and reorganize around Yakamul and Maljip. By 4 August, Adachi ordered a complete withdrawal towards Wewak, although fighting lasted until around 10 August as U.S. troops continued to clash with the Japanese rearguard. Around this time, elements of the U.S. 43rd Division, consisting of the 103rd, 169th and 172nd Infantry Regiments, began relieving the 127th and 128th Infantry Regiments. From 16 August they took up the pursuit of the withdrawing Japanese force. During this time, U.S. troops patrolled towards Marubian, Charov and Jalup, but were unable to reestablish contact until reaching strong positions on the Dandriwad River. At this point, the U.S. commander, Krueger, called a halt to the advance and the battle was officially declared over on 25 August.

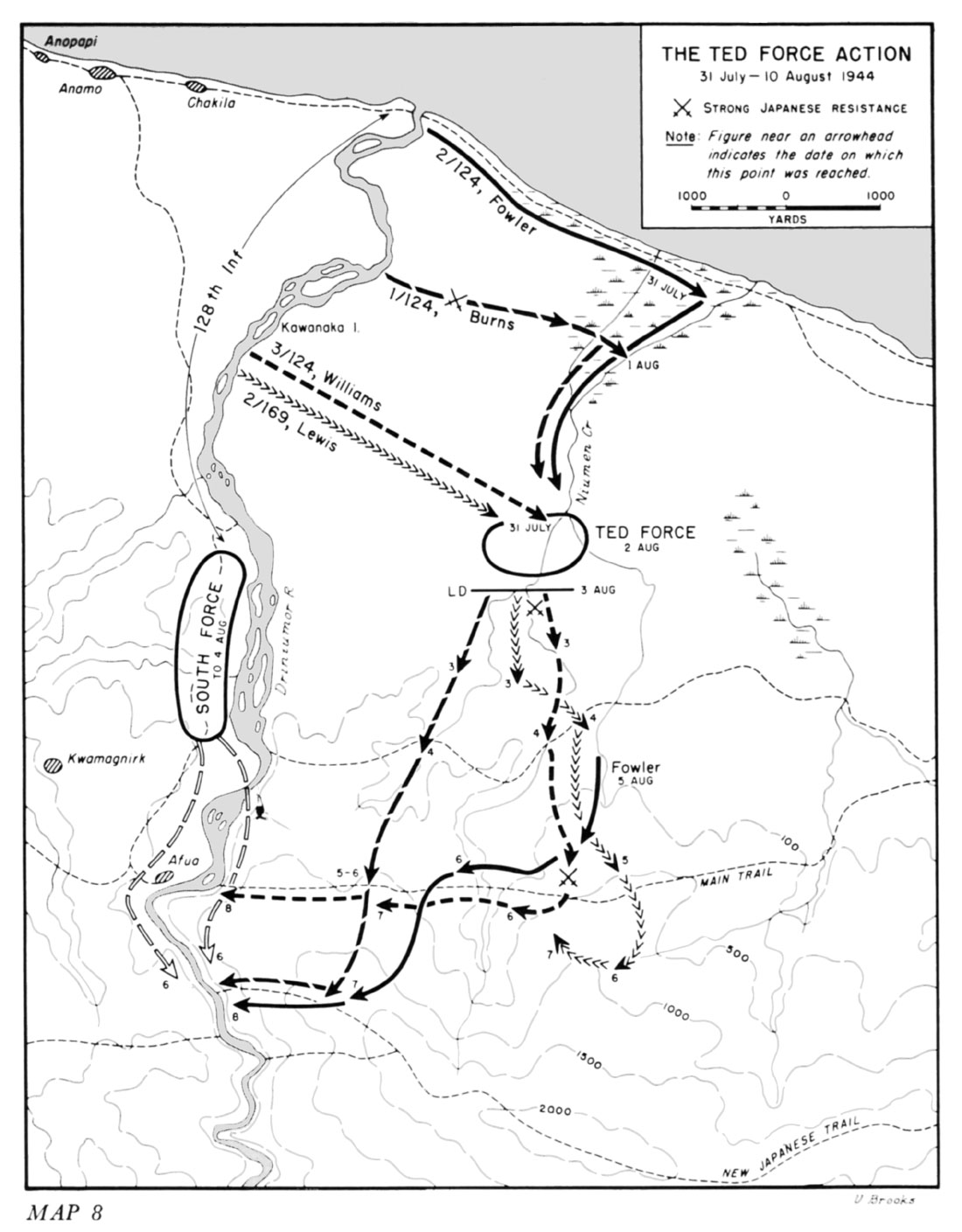
Map depicting the eastern envelopment maneuver by US forces in late July – early August

Air support during the fighting was provided to the Allied ground troops by Australian Beaufighters and Beauforts from No. 71 Wing RAAF and U.S. aircraft from the 110th Reconnaissance Squadron operating from Tadji and Saidor. Naval gunfire support was provided by Task Force 74 (TF 74), comprising two Australian cruisers (Australia and Shropshire), two Australian destroyers (Arunta and Warramunga) and two U.S. destroyers (Ammen and Bache). Allied PT boats and destroyers also interdicted Japanese barge supply convoys between Aitape and Wewak and fired upon troop concentrations along coastal avenues of advance. Due to the dense terrain, most supplies were airdropped to U.S. troops on the ground rather than being carried forward overland.

== Aftermath ==
Four U.S. soldiers were awarded the Medal of Honor (all posthumously), for acts of outstanding valor during the battle: Private Donald R. Lobaugh of the 127th Infantry Regiment, Staff Sergeant Gerald L. Endl of the 128th Infantry Regiment, and Second Lieutenants George W. G. Boyce, Jr. and Dale Eldon Christensen of 112th Cavalry Regiment. All told the Americans suffered almost 3,000 casualties including 440 killed and 2,550 wounded and 10 missing, while the Japanese lost 8,000–10,000 men (including battle and non-battle casualties due to starvation and disease). Of the U.S. units involved in the battle, the 112th Cavalry, 124th Infantry and 169th Infantry Regiments suffered the heaviest casualties. The four-week Battle of Driniumor River was one of the costliest of the campaigns in Papua and New Guinea, second only to the bloody head-on Allied assaults of the Japanese strongholds at Gona, Buna and Sanananda from November 1942 – January 1943.

In the aftermath, U.S. forces largely focused their efforts on defending their base and airfields around Aitape, undertaking only limited patrolling around the perimeter. Meanwhile, Adachi reorganized his forces, moving his headquarters to Wewak. The 51st Division also established itself there, while the 20th Division reoriented its elements between But, Dagua and Maprik and the 41st Division moved to the Anumb River–Balif area. Having suffered heavy casualties and receiving little in the way of supplies, the Japanese were forced to begin subsistence operations. They subsequently clashed with Australian forces during the Aitape–Wewak campaign from late 1944 after the Australians arrived in the area to relieve U.S. troops who were transferred to the Philippines.
