= George Boyce =

George Boyce may refer to:

- George W. G. Boyce Jr. (1916–1944), United States Army officer and Medal of Honor recipient
- George Price Boyce (1826–1897), British watercolour painter
- George Boyce (Canadian politician) (1848–1930), Unionist MP for Carleton, 1917–1921
- D. G. Boyce (D. George Boyce, 1942–2020), Northern Irish historian
