= William H. Thomas (Medal of Honor) =

- Born: January 13, 1923; Wynne, Arkansas, US
- Died: April 22, 1945 (aged 22); Zambales Mountains, Luzon, the Philippines
- Burial place: Manila American Cemetery and Memorial, the Philippines
- Military career
- Allegiance: United States of America
- Branch: United States Army
- Service years: 1942–1945
- Rank: Private First Class
- Units: 149th Infantry Regiment, 38th Infantry Division
- Conflicts: World War II
- Awards: Medal of Honor

William H. Thomas (January 13, 1923 – April 22, 1945) was a United States Army soldier and a recipient of the United States military's highest decoration—the Medal of Honor—for his actions in World War II.

== Biography ==
Thomas joined the Army from Ypsilanti, Michigan in 1942, and by April 22, 1945, was serving as a private first class in the 149th Infantry Regiment, 38th Infantry Division. On that day, during a firefight in the Zambales Mountains on the island of Luzon in the Philippines, Thomas continued to fight even after being mortally wounded by an explosion which blew off both of his legs. He died later that day and was posthumously awarded the Medal of Honor five months later, on September 24, 1945.

Thomas, aged 22 at his death, was buried at the Manila American Cemetery and Memorial in the Philippines.

== Medal of Honor citation ==
Private First Class Thomas' official Medal of Honor citation reads:

He was a member of the leading squad of Company B, which was attacking along a narrow, wooded ridge. The enemy strongly entrenched in camouflaged emplacements on the hill beyond directed heavy fire and hurled explosive charges on the attacking riflemen. Pfc. Thomas, an automatic rifleman, was struck by 1 of these charges, which blew off both his legs below the knees. He refused medical aid and evacuation, and continued to fire at the enemy until his weapon was put out of action by an enemy bullet. Still refusing aid, he threw his last 2 grenades. He destroyed 3 of the enemy after suffering the wounds from which he died later that day. The effective fire of Pfc. Thomas prevented the repulse of his platoon and assured the capture of the hostile position. His magnificent courage and heroic devotion to duty provided a lasting inspiration for his comrades.

== See also ==
- List of Medal of Honor recipients
- List of Medal of Honor recipients for World War II
- USS Rixey, a troopship named at one time for Thomas.
