= James Boyce =

James Boyce may refer to:

- James Petigru Boyce (1827–1888), American theologian
- James F. Boyce (1868–1935), American chemist
- James Boyce (Louisiana politician) (1922–1990), American businessman and chairman of the Louisiana Republican Party
- Jim Boyce (football administrator) (born 1944), former vice-president of FIFA
- Jim Boyce (rugby union) (born 1941), Australian rugby union player
- Jimmy Boyce (1947–1994), British politician
- Jim Boyce (tennis) (born 1951), Canadian tennis player
- James Boyce (author), Tasmanian academic and anti-gambling advocate
- James K. Boyce, environmental political economist
