= Francis Irby Gwaltney =

American novelist

Francis Irby Gwaltney (9 September 1921 in Traskwood, Arkansas – 27 February 1981) was a prolific Southern American author. He was the most well known author to have set his books in Arkansas.

== Biography ==
Gwaltney was born in Traskwood, Arkansas, to Boulanger Gwaltney, M.D. (1887–1923), and Mary Effie Irby Gwaltney (1889–1945). After his father died, Gwaltney was raised in Charleston, Arkansas.

During World War II, he served with the 112th Cavalry in the Philippines Campaign (1944–45) where he met Norman Mailer.

Returning to Arkansas after the war, Gwaltney obtained his high school diploma, then earned a degree in English from the University of Arkansas. He married Emma Carolyn Calhoun on August 19, 1947, earned a master's degree in English in 1950 and taught at Arkansas Tech University in Russellville, Arkansas (1952–53, 1970–81) and Louisiana Tech University in Ruston, Louisiana (1963–70).

He wrote his first novel The Yeller-Headed Summer with help of his war buddy, Norman Mailer. His most famous novel based on his war experiences was The Day the Century Ended that was filmed as Between Heaven and Hell.

Gwaltney wrote teleplays for Alfred Hitchcock Presents and The Fugitive.

== Works ==
- The Yeller-Headed Summer (1954), republished as The Whole Town Knew (1955)
- The Day the Century Ended (1955), republished in paperback as Between Heaven and Hell (1961)
- A Moment Of Warmth (1957)
- Historic Washington, Arkansas: A Survey (1958)
- The Numbers of Our Days (1959), reprinted as The Violators (1960)
- A Step in the River: A Novel (1960), reprinted in paperback as Consent and Desire (1962)
- The Quicksand Years (1965)
- Destiny's Chickens (1973), reprinted in paperback with same title (1974)
- Idols and Axle Grease (1974)
