= Bart Burns =

American actor

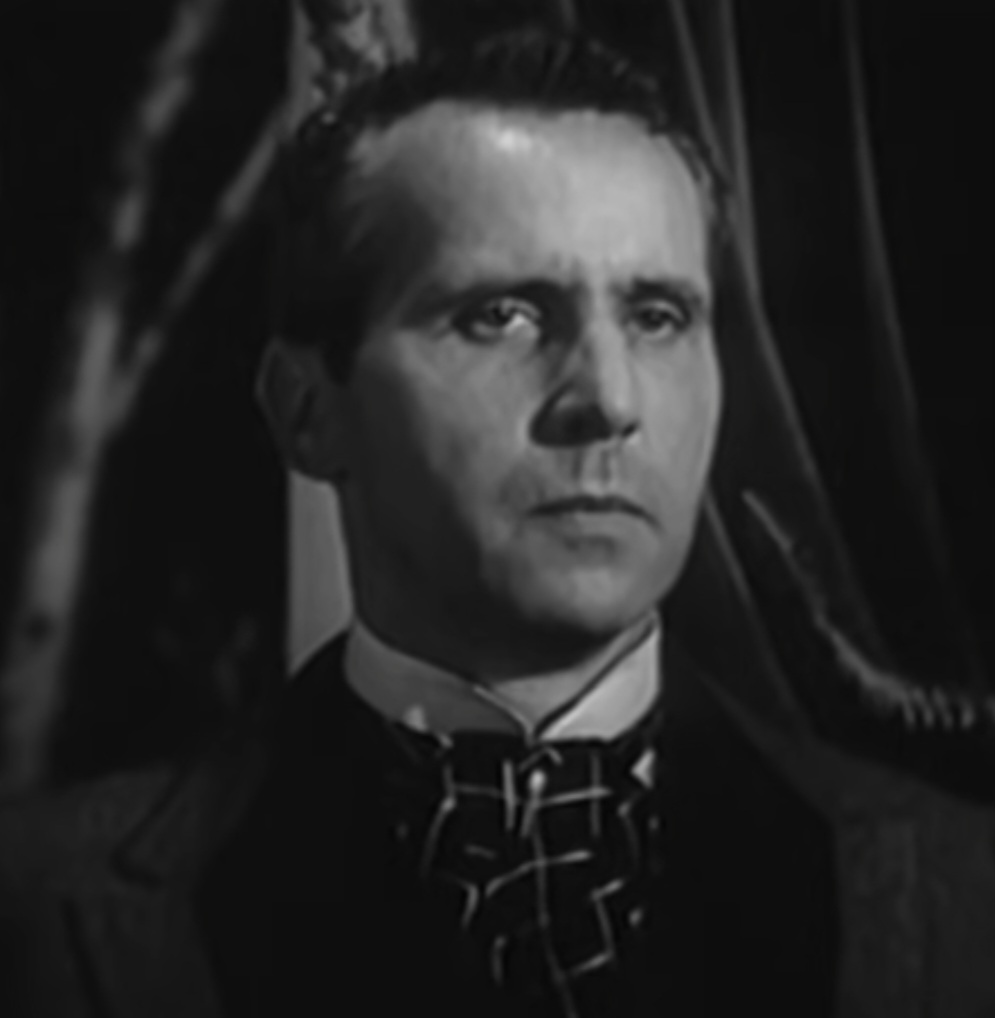
- Burns in an episode of One Step Beyond (1959)
- Born: George Joseph Burns; March 13, 1918; New York City, U.S.
- Died: July 17, 2007 (aged 89); West Hills, Los Angeles, California, U.S.
- Resting place: Westwood Village Memorial Park Cemetery
- Occupation: Actor
- Years active: 1953–1988
- Spouse: Fern Burns
- Children: 4

George Joseph Burns (born March 13, 1918 – July 17, 2007) was an American character actor. He is known mostly for playing Pat Chambers on the 1959 Mickey Spillane's Mike Hammer television show and for numerous appearances on American television series, such as Gunsmoke. He was also featured on the television show Dragnet as a purse snatcher with the help of trained dogs.

== Early life ==
The son of a New York City Police Department inspector, Burns attended Cornell University and Columbia University. Following the attack on Pearl Harbor, Burns enlisted in the United States Marine Corps. He was a captain and company commander of "A" Company First Battalion 25th Marines and was awarded the Silver Star Medal. Captain Burns located an enemy strongpoint and personally guided a tank to destroy the emplacement. Burns's two brothers were also captains, one in the army and one in the Marine Corps.

== Acting career ==
In 1947 Burns changed his first name to avoid confusion with comedian George Burns. He made his Broadway debut in the original production of Mister Roberts alongside Henry Fonda.

Burns began appearing on American television in 1953 including appearing in the original 1954 television broadcast of Twelve Angry Men. During his acting career he befriended Ernest Borgnine where he supervised Ernest repainting scenery. Borgnine recalled that during the 1950s Burns was rejected from the lead of a show, eventually finding out it was due to his befriending suspected communists. Burns brought his medals and captains bars to the producers and shouted "Does this look like I'm a goddammned communist?" He did not get the part.

Burns made his motion picture debut in the 1956 war film Between Heaven and Hell. He also wrote several of the Kilroy episodes of The Wonderful World of Color for Walt Disney.

== Death ==
Burns died in 2007 in Los Angeles, California. He was buried in Westwood Village Memorial Park Cemetery and was survived by his wife Fern; three sons Brendan, Timothy and Sean; daughter Siobhan and a granddaughter.

== Partial filmography ==
- 1954: Studio One - "Twelve Angry Men" (TV episode) - Juror No. 6
- 1956: Between Heaven and Hell – Private Raker – Company G
- 1957: Alfred Hitchcock Presents (Season 2 Episode 31: "The Night the World Ended") - Nick the Bartender
- 1957: Fear Strikes Out – Joe Cronin (uncredited)
- 1957-1958: Official Detective (TV Series) – Donahue
- 1957: The Walter Winchell File (1957, Episode: "The Law and Aaron Benjamin") – Berliss Posada
- 1960: Tall Story – District Attorney Davis
- 1961: Wanted Dead or Alive (TV series) Season 3 Episode 19 (Epitaph) – Sheriff Walt Sommers
- 1962: The Alfred Hitchcock Hour (Season 1 Episode 5: "Captive Audience") - Summers
- 1964: Seven Days in May – Secret Service Director Corwin
- 1969: Number One – Ed Davis
- 1970: There Was a Crooked Man... – Dr. Loomis
- 1971: Earth II (TV Movie) – Steiner
- 1973: The Iceman Cometh – Lieb
- 1974: The Nickel Ride – Elias
- 1976: Helter Skelter – Frank Fowles
- 1980: Seed of Innocence – Ray Crocker
- 1982: Frances – Ernest Farmer
- 1983: Money to Burn – Bank Guard
- 1986: Legal Eagles – Judge #1
- 1988: Fear – Link Reilley (final film role)
