= William Boyce =

William Boyce may refer to:

- William Boyce (composer) (1711–1779), English-born composer and Master of the King's Musick
- William Binnington Boyce (1804–1889), English-born philologist and clergyman, active in Australia
- William W. Boyce (1818–1890), U.S. Confederate congressional delegate
- William H. Boyce (1855–1942), jurist and U.S. representative from Delaware
- William D. Boyce (1858–1929), founder of the Boy Scouts of America
- William Boyce (rapist) (1865–1887), convicted rapist from the Mount Rennie rape case
- William Martin Boyce (born 1938), American mathematician

== See also ==
- Billy Boyce (1927–2011), Australian boxer
- William Boyce Thompson (1869–1930), American mining engineer and financier
