= 112th Cavalry Regiment =

- Coat of arms
- Active: 1918–present.
- Country: United States
- Allegiance: Texas
- Branch: United States Army
- Type: Armored Cavalry
- Size: Regiment
- Nickname: "Little Giant of the Pacific"
- Motto: Rarin' to Go

Insignia
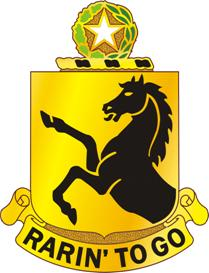
- Distinctive unit insignia

The 112th Cavalry Regiment is a Texas National Guard regiment that served in several Pacific campaigns during World War II.

== Early history ==
The 112th Cavalry Regiment was constituted in the National Guard in 1921, assigned to the 23rd Cavalry Division, and allotted to the state of Texas. The regiment was assigned along with New Mexico's 111th Cavalry Regiment to the 56th Cavalry Brigade; in 1929, the 111th Cavalry was replaced by the 124th Cavalry. The 112th Cavalry regimental headquarters was organized on 20 July 1921 at Dallas, Texas, by redesignation of the 1st Texas Cavalry Regiment (constituted on 20 February 1920; organized and federally recognized on 16 December 1920) as the 112th Cavalry. Subordinate squadron headquarters were concurrently organized at Dallas. The regimental headquarters was successively relocated as follows: to Fort Worth, Texas, on 19 July 1925; to Dallas about August 1938.

The regiment, or elements thereof, was called up to perform the following state duties: to perform martial law during the reduction of the Borger, Texas, criminal ring in September–October 1929; to restore order after the race riot in Sherman, Texas, in May 1930; and to perform patrolling and production regulation in the East Texas oilfields during September 1931–December 1932. Elements of the regiment were also called up to perform emergency relief duties after the Oak Cliff, Texas, tornado, 30–31 July 1933, and the New London, Texas, school explosion in March 1937. The regiment conducted summer training at Camp Mabry, Austin, Texas, 1921–23; Camp Stanley, San Antonio, Texas, 1924–26; and most years at Camp Wolters, Mineral Wells, Texas, 1927–39. Its designated mobilization training station was Fort Brown, Texas, 1922–33, and Fort Bliss, El Paso, Texas, 1933–40.

The regiment was relieved from the 23rd Cavalry Division on 1 April 1939 after the 56th Cavalry Brigade was designated a separate brigade and assigned to the Third Army. It was reorganized on 23 July 1939 as a three-squadron regiment, with a new 3rd Squadron organized at Dallas. The headquarters and headquarters troop of the 3rd Squadron was inactivated on 1 October 1940 and Troops I and K were assigned to the 1st and 2nd Squadrons as Troops C and G, respectively. The regiment was inducted into active federal service at home stations on 18 November 1940 as an element of the 56th Cavalry Brigade, and transferred to Fort Bliss, arriving there on 28 November 1940 and being assigned to the Third Army. It transferred on 5 February 1941 to Fort Clark, Texas. On arrival, it relieved the Fort Clark Command sector of the Mexican Border Patrol.

== World War II ==
On 10 November 1940 President Roosevelt federalized the National Guard, and on 18 November 1940 the 112th was posted to Fort Bliss. The 112th's sister regiment in the brigade, the 124th Cavalry was the last of the cavalry regiments to give up their horses and was later sent to Burma.

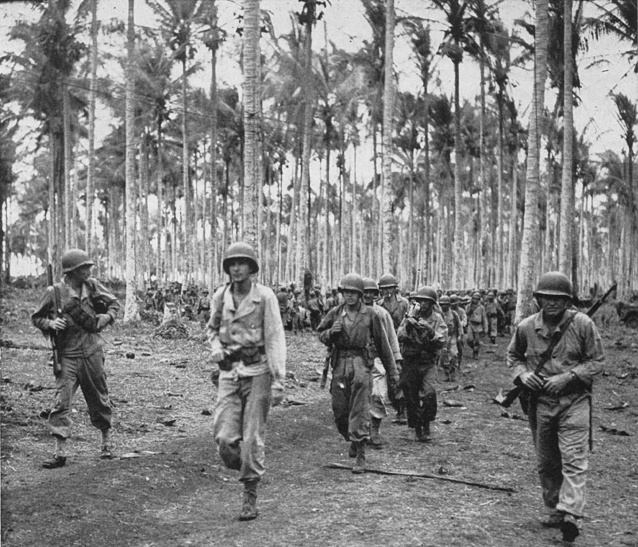
112th RCT soldiers move through a coconut plantation at Arawe

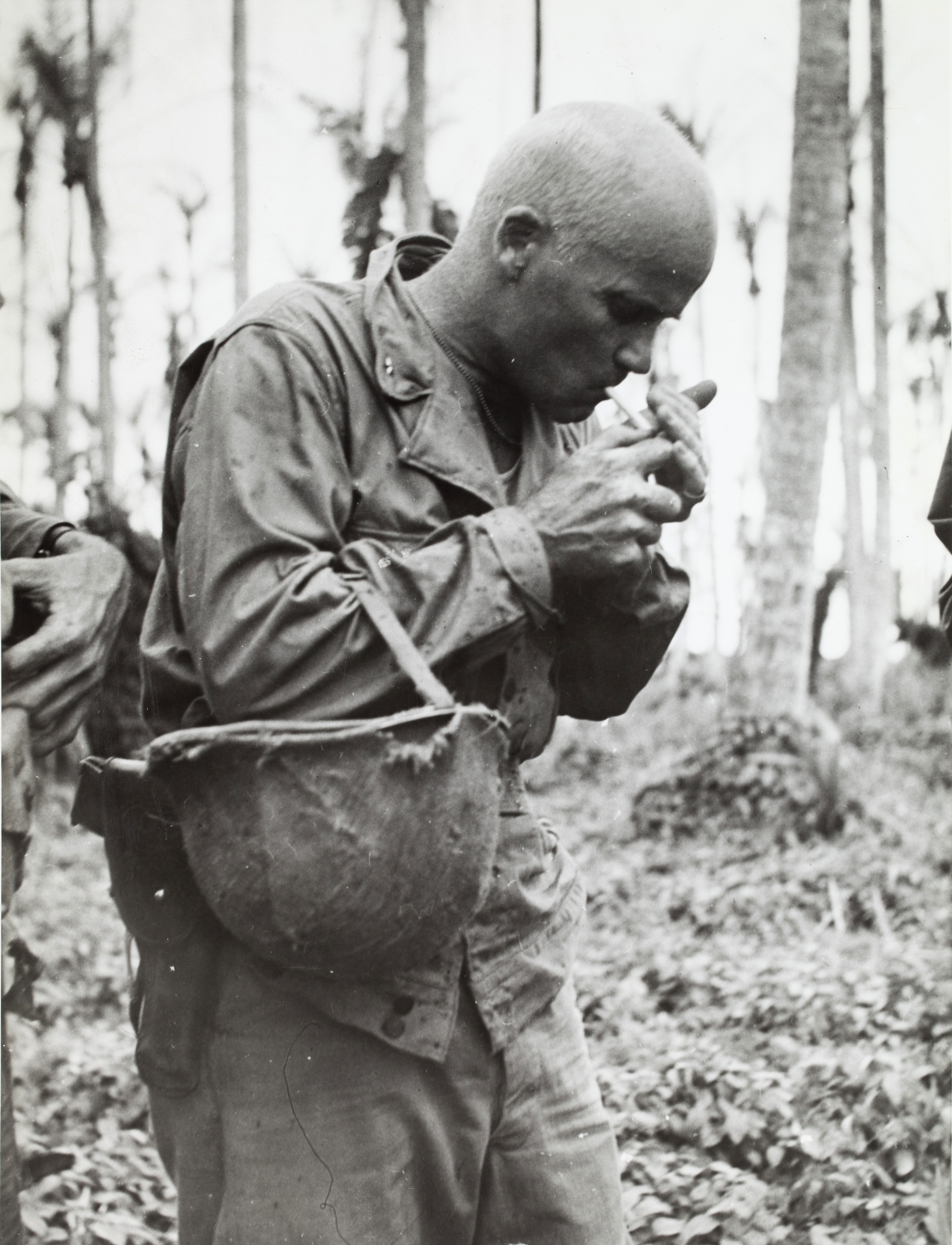
General Julian Cunningham lights a cigarette at Amulet Plantation, New Britain, 1943

The regiment patrolled the Mexican border until being shipped to New Caledonia on 8 July 1942 arriving on 11 August 1942. They were assigned to the Americal Division under General Alexander Patch. The 112th Cavalry were assigned Australian Waler horses, and ordered to New Caledonia to serve as a horse mounted security force. General Patch initially thought horse mounted cavalry could be used in jungle warfare, but the torrential Pacific rains and the mud that followed damaged the horses' hooves, changing the general's mind. The Australian horses were shipped to Burma and assigned to Chinese forces who mistreated them. In 1944 the Walers rejoined the American Army being assigned to Merrill's Marauders.

During the heavy fighting on Guadalcanal, General Alexander Vandegrift of the 1st Marine Division sent an urgent request for machetes for his Marines. General Patch took the sabers of the regiment, cut them down and sent them to the Marines for jungle warfare use.

After extensive training the 112th made its first amphibious landing at Woodlark Island as part of Operation Chronicle on 30 June 1943. The landing was unopposed, and the cavalrymen established a defensible perimeter to protect Seabees building an airstrip on the island.

The regiment was sent to Goodenough Island for training and became part of Task Force Director in preparation for its first action, Operation Director the Battle of Arawe. The 112th set sail on USS Carter Hall, HMAS Westralia and the high speed transports USS Sands and USS Humphreys. On 15 December 1943 the regiment landed in three separate amphibious operations on New Britain.

One of these landings involved Troop A of the 2nd Squadron landing in rubber boats off Sands against fierce defense that sank all but three of the boats. The destroyer USS Shaw sailed close as possible to the enemy defenders to shell them and rescue the survivors of A Troop.

Troop B landed at Pilelo Island from Humphreys in 15 rubber boats on the same day. When meeting resistance from Japanese troops in caves, Troop B destroyed one with a bazooka and one with a flamethrower the first use of the weapon in the South West Pacific area.

The main landings were from amphibious tractors launched from Carter Hall and landing craft from Westralia. In this landing the 112th Cavalry were the first to use the 4.5-inch (110 mm) rocket firing DUKWs.

After linking up with the 1st Marine Division, the 112th was assigned to the 32nd Infantry Division in Aitape Papua New Guinea. The regiment fought in the Battle of Driniumor River for 51 days taking 62% casualties. Two of the regiment's second lieutenants, Dale Eldon Christensen and George W. G. Boyce Jr. were awarded the Medal of Honor for their actions during this period.

On 1 October 1944 the 112th Cavalry was combined with the 114th Field Artillery Battalion became the 112th Regimental Combat Team (RCT) and departed Aitape for Leyte in the Philippines on 31 October 1944. The 112th RCT was attached to the 1st Cavalry Division for the Battle of Leyte and Battle of Luzon.

Following the Japanese surrender, the 112th landed in Japan for Occupation Duties on 3 September 1945.

During World War II the 112th Cavalry served 434 days in combat. They were the first U.S. Army unit in the Southwest Pacific to use bazookas and flame throwers against enemy defenses and first used rocket firing DUKWs in amphibious assaults. The 112th were the first unit in the Philippines to use helicopters to evacuate their wounded.

Two of the regiment's late replacements authored books after the war ended. Norman Mailer wrote The Naked and the Dead, and Francis Gwaltney authored The Day the Century Ended, later filmed as Between Heaven and Hell.

== Postwar ==
The regiment was inactivated in Japan in 1946 but was re-organized on 13 November 1947 as the 112th Mechanized Cavalry Reconnaissance Squadron, then reorganized on 12 September 1949 as the 112th Armored Cavalry Regiment. On 16 March 1957 the regiment became the 112th Armor and was transferred to active service. In 1961 it was transferred back to the National Guard as part of the 49th Armored Division. Following the reflagging of the 49th Armored Division, the 112th Armor became part of the 56th Brigade of the 36th Infantry Division.

From 1973 all of the Texas Army National Guard armor units were renumbered as battalions of the 112th Armor. From 1988 to 1993 eight battalions were assigned to the 112th making it then the largest armored regiment in the U.S. Army.

== 21st Century ==
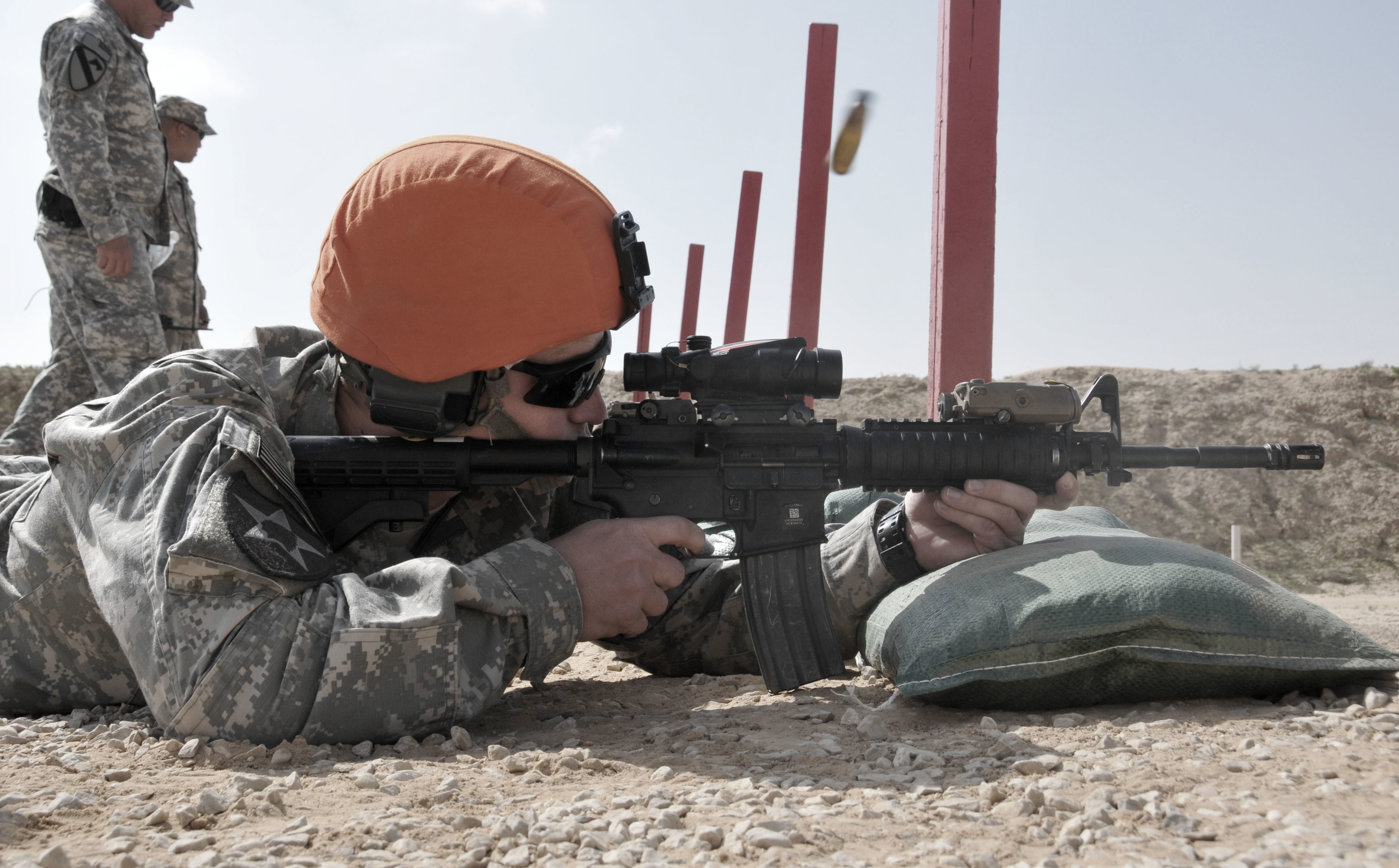
A member of the 1st Squadron, 112th Cavalry Regiment firing a carbine during a competition held as part of a deployment to the Sinai region of Egypt in 2015

On 17 October 2008, the 4th Battalion, 112th Armor was renamed 1st Squadron, 112th Cavalry. The unit carries the colors and lineage of the original 112th Cavalry Regiment. The squadron Headquarters and Headquarters Troop is based in Bryan, Texas, with A Troop, B Troop, and C Troop based in Taylor, Rosenberg, and Houston, respectively. A and B Troops are equipped as cavalry units with HMMWVs, and C Troop is a dismounted infantry unit.

The 1st Squadron, 112th Cavalry is part of the 72nd Infantry Brigade Combat Team now part of the 36th Infantry Division.

In early 2015, 1-112 Cavalry deployed to the Sinai Peninsula in Egypt as multinational force and observers (MFO), tasked with ensuring peace between Israel and Egypt in accordance with the 1979 treaty between the two nations. The squadron completed its tour in November 2015 and redeployed to the United States.

In 2020, 1-112 Cavalry again deployed to the Sinai Peninsula. 1-112 Cavalry officially assumed MFO duties in the Sinai on 8 March 2020, relieving 1st Battalion, 294th Infantry Regiment of the Guam Army National Guard. On 24 November 2020, 1-112 Cavalry was relieved by 1st Battalion, 133rd Field Artillery Regiment, also of the Texas Army National Guard.

== Campaign Participation Credit ==
World War II: New Guinea Bismarck Archipelago (with arrowhead) Leyte Luzon

Headquarters Company, 1st Battalion; Headquarters Company, 3rd Battalion; and Company B, 3rd Battalion, each additionally entitled to: World War II-EAME: Naples-Foggia Anzio Rome-Arno Southern France (with arrowhead) Rhineland Ardennes-Alsace Central Europe

Company C, 1st Battalion, additionally entitled to: World War II-EAME: Ryukyus

== Decorations ==
Army Superior Unit Award: 4th Battalion, 112th Armor Regiment (HHC, A, B, C Troops - 18 JAN 06 to 6 DEC 06). Army Superior Unit Award: 1st Battalion, 112th Armor Regiment (2 SEP 05 - 11 OCT 05). Army Superior Unit Award: 5th Battalion, 112th Armor Regiment (2 SEP 05 - 11 OCT 05). Meritorious Unit Award: 2nd Battalion, 112th Armor Regiment (5 JAN 05 - 21 NOV 05). Meritorious Unit Award: 3rd Battalion, 112th Armor Regiment (5 JAN 05 - 10 FEB 06). Navy Unit Commendation: 2nd Battalion, 112th Armor Regiment (1 MAR 05 - 28 MAR 06).

Philippine Presidential Unit Citation: 17 October 1944-4 July 1945 DA GO 47.

Headquarters Company, 1st Battalion, additionally entitled to: French Croix de Guerre with Palm, World War II, Streamer embroidered VOSGES (636th Tank Destroyer Battalion cited, DA GO 43).

Headquarters Company, 3rd Battalion, and Company B, 3rd Battalion, each additionally entitled to: Presidential Unit Citation (Army), Streamer embroidered SIEGFRIED LINE (142d Infantry cited, WD GO 37, 1946). Presidential Unit Citation (Army), Streamer embroidered SELESTAT (1st Battalion, 142d Infantry cited; WD GO 56, 1946). French Croix de Guerre with Palm, World War II, Steamer embroidered VOSGES (142d Infantry cited; DA GO 43, 1950).
