= Mickey Spillane's Mike Hammer (1958 TV series) =

Television series (1958)

- Starring: Darren McGavin; Bart Burns
- Theme music composer: Dave Kahn; Melvyn Lenard Gordon
- Opening theme: "Riff Blues"
- Country of origin: United States
- Original language: English
- No. of episodes: 78 (list of episodes)

Production
- Producer: Richard Irving
- Running time: 30 minutes
- Production company: Revue Studios

Original release
- Network: Syndication
- Release: January 7, 1958 – November 28, 1959

Mickey Spillane's Mike Hammer is the first syndicated television series based on Spillane's hard-boiled private detective Mike Hammer, played by Darren McGavin. The series was produced from 1957 to 1959, and had a run of 78 episodes over two seasons. Episodes were filmed in black and white and filled a half-hour time slot. As a syndicated television series, original air dates and the order of episodes vary by geographic location – for example, in New York City the series debuted January 28, 1958, on WCBS-TV, and the first episode aired was "Letter Edged in Blackmail".

== Cast ==
=== Main ===
- Darren McGavin as Mike Hammer
- Bart Burns as Captain Pat Chambers

=== Recurring ===
- Vito Scotti as Geta
- Johnny Seven as Carl Pate
- Dale Van Sickel as Blackie Davis
- James Westerfield as Bill 'Murph' Murphy
- Patricia Huston as Mary Otto
- Walter Reed as Fred Rankin

== Production and casting ==
Darren McGavin played the title role. McGavin would go on to play another hard-boiled private detective in the short-lived 1968 series The Outsider. Bart Burns played Captain Pat Chambers, Hammer's main ally in the Police department.

== Episodes ==
=== Season 1 (1958) ===
| No. overall | No. in season | Title | Original release date |
|---|---|---|---|
| 1 | 1 | "The High Cost of Dying" | January 7, 1958 |
| 2 | 2 | "Just Around the Coroner" | January 14, 1958 |
| 3 | 3 | "Hot Hands, Cold Dice" | January 21, 1958 |
| 4 | 4 | "Death Gets a Diploma" | January 28, 1958 |
| 5 | 5 | "So That's Who It Was" | February 11, 1958 |
| 6 | 6 | "Dead Men Don't Dream" | February 18, 1958 |
| 7 | 7 | "Letter Edged in Blackmail" | February 25, 1958 |
| 8 | 8 | "Death Takes an Encore" | March 7, 1958 |
| 9 | 9 | "Lead Ache" | March 14, 1958 |
| 10 | 10 | "Overdose of Lead" | March 21, 1958 |
| 11 | 11 | "A Grave Undertaking" | March 28, 1958 |
| 12 | 12 | "A Shot in the Arm" | April 4, 1958 |
| 13 | 13 | "Stay Out of Town" | April 11, 1958 |
| 14 | 14 | "Beautiful, Blue and Deadly" | April 18, 1958 |
| 15 | 15 | "Skinned Deep" | April 25, 1958 |
| 16 | 16 | "Peace Bond" | May 2, 1958 |
| 17 | 17 | "Play Belles' Toll" | May 9, 1958 |
| 18 | 18 | "For Sale, Deathbed, Used" | May 16, 1958 |
| 19 | 19 | "Music to Die By" | May 23, 1958 |
| 20 | 20 | "My Fair Deadly" | May 30, 1958 |
| 21 | 21 | "The New Look" | June 7, 1958 |
| 22 | 22 | "The Broken Frame" | June 14, 1958 |
| 23 | 23 | "Look at the Old Man Go" | June 21, 1958 |
| 24 | 24 | "The Paper Shroud" | June 28, 1958 |
| 25 | 25 | "My Son and Heir" | July 5, 1958 |
| 26 | 26 | "Final Curtain" | July 12, 1958 |
| 27 | 27 | "A Detective Tail" | July 19, 1958 |
| 28 | 28 | "It's an Art" | July 26, 1958 |
| 29 | 29 | "Four Blind Mice" | August 2, 1958 |
| 30 | 30 | "No Pockets in a Shroud" | August 9, 1958 |
| 31 | 31 | "The Living Dead" | August 16, 1958 |
| 32 | 32 | "Old Folks at Home Blues" | August 23, 1958 |
| 33 | 33 | "No Business Like -----" | August 30, 1958 |
| 34 | 34 | "Crepe for Suzette" | September 7, 1958 |
| 35 | 35 | "Letter of the Weak" | September 14, 1958 |
| 36 | 36 | "That School Girl Complex" | September 21, 1958 |
| 37 | 37 | "To Bury a Friend" | September 28, 1958 |
| 38 | 38 | "Mere Maid" | October 5, 1958 |
| 39 | 39 | "Scar and Garter" | October 12, 1958 |

=== Season 2 (1959) ===
| No. overall | No. in season | Title | Original release date |
|---|---|---|---|
| 40 | 1 | "Baubles, Bangles and Blood" | January 2, 1959 |
| 41 | 2 | "Accentuate the Negative" | January 9, 1959 |
| 42 | 3 | "Requiem for a Sucker" | January 15, 1959 |
| 43 | 4 | "According to Luke" | January 23, 1959 |
| 44 | 5 | "Jury of One" | January 30, 1959 |
| 45 | 6 | "I Ain't Talkin'" | February 7, 1959 |
| 46 | 7 | "The Big Drop" | February 14, 1959 |
| 47 | 8 | "Aces and Eights" | February 15, 1959 |
| 48 | 9 | "Husbands Are Bad Luck" | February 28, 1959 |
| 49 | 10 | "Coney Island Baby" | March 1959 |
| 50 | 11 | "Save Me in San Salvador" | March 20, 1959 |
| 51 | 12 | "Park the Body" | April 2, 1959 |
| 52 | 13 | "Tattoo Bruté?" | April 9, 1959 |
| 53 | 14 | "Another Man's Poisson" | April 12, 1959 |
| 54 | 15 | "When I Am Dead, My Darling..." | April 16, 1959 |
| 55 | 16 | "Swing Low, Sweet Harriet" | April 23, 1959 |
| 56 | 17 | "The Last Aloha" | April 30, 1959 |
| 57 | 18 | "Shoot Before You Look" | May 1, 1959 |
| 58 | 19 | "Evidence on the Record" | May 8, 1959 |
| 59 | 20 | "The Commodore" | May 15, 1959 |
| 60 | 21 | "Curtains for an Angel" | May 22, 1959 |
| 61 | 22 | "A Haze on the Lake" | May 29, 1959 |
| 62 | 23 | "See No Evil" | June 4, 1959 |
| 63 | 24 | "Bride and Doom" | June 18, 1959 |
| 64 | 25 | "Pen Pals" | July 10, 1959 |
| 65 | 26 | "Groomed to Kill" | July 17, 1959 |
| 66 | 27 | "Doll Trouble" | July 31, 1959 |
| 67 | 28 | "Stocks and Blondes" | August 7, 1959 |
| 68 | 29 | "Slab Happy" | September 11, 1959 |
| 69 | 30 | "Siamese Twinge" | September 18, 1959 |
| 70 | 31 | "Goodbye, Al" | September 25, 1959 |
| 71 | 32 | "Merchant of Menace" | October 11, 1959 |
| 72 | 33 | "I Remember Sally" | October 17, 1959 |
| 74 | 34 | "A Mugging Evening" | October 23, 1959 |
| 74 | 35 | "Wedding Mourning" | October 24, 1959 |
| 75 | 36 | "Now Die In It" | November 1, 1959 |
| 76 | 37 | "Slay Upon Delivery" | November 10, 1959 |
| 77 | 38 | "Dixie Is Dead" | November 21, 1959 |
| 78 | 39 | "M Is For Mother" | November 28, 1959 |

== Home media ==
On September 20, 2011, A&E Home Video released Mickey Spillane's Mike Hammer: The Complete Series on DVD in Region 1 for the first time. The 12-disc set featured all 78 episodes of the series.

== Reception ==
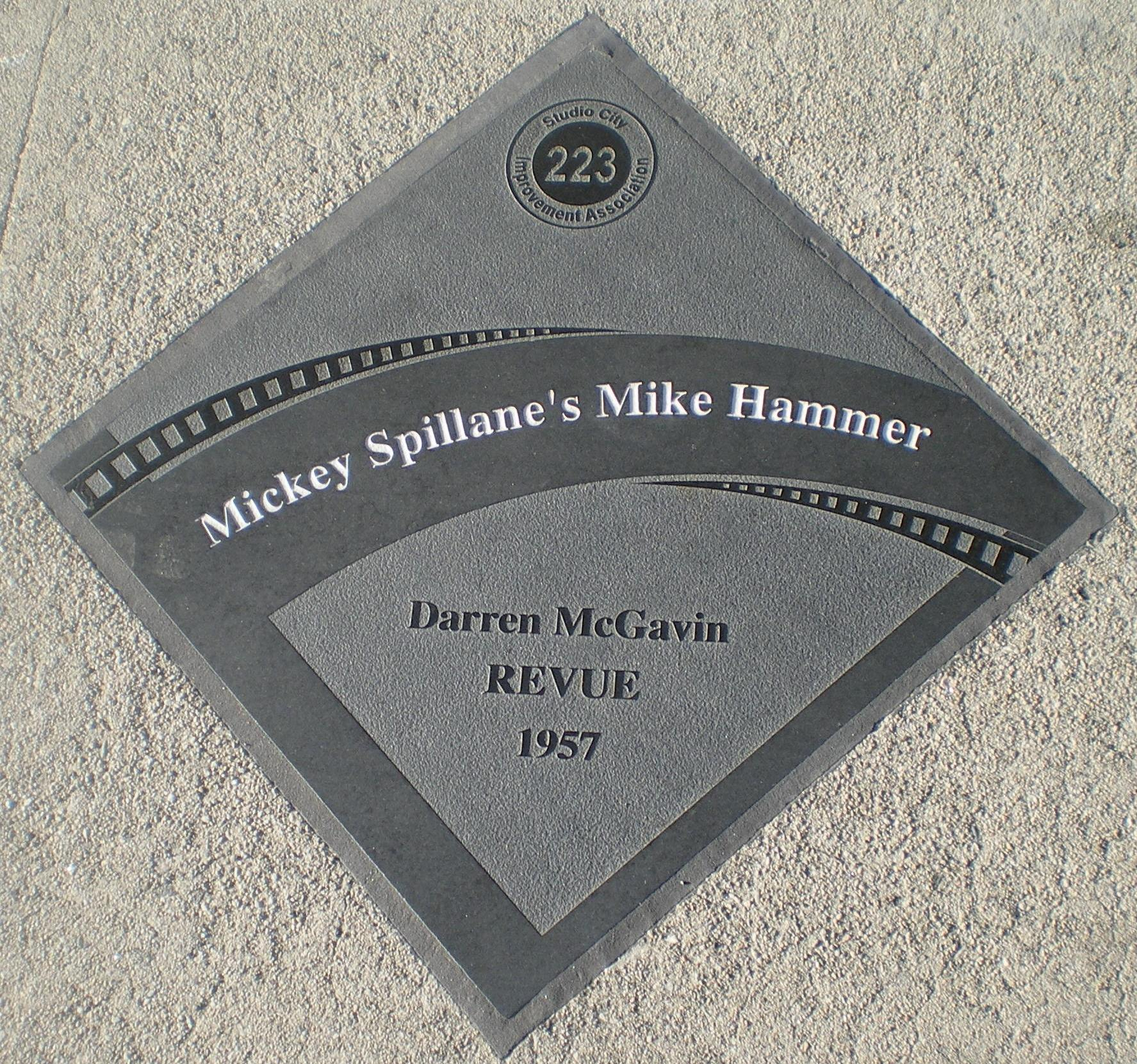
Mickey Spillane's Mike Hammer Diamond Studio City Walk of Fame

Public and critical reaction to the show was mixed. While TV Guide referred to it as "easily the worst series on TV", McGavin said that the show was "instantly successful". Some reviewers were critical of the show for its use of excessive and gratuitous violence. However, McGavin made a point of playing the role of Hammer with a hint of tongue-in-cheek satire – against the wishes of Universal Studios executives.

Unlike the series that appeared in the 1980s, Mickey Spillane had minimal involvement in the production of the 1950s program. "I just took the money and went home," Spillane said of the show. "Believe me, I had bigger fish to fry, namely, that darn elusive Batmanfish."
