= Boice =

Boice is a surname. Notable people with the name include:

- Griffin Boice, American producer and songwriter
- James Boice (writer), American writer
- James Montgomery Boice, theologian and pastor

== See also ==
- Boyce (surname)
