= Dale Eldon Christensen =

American army officer and Medal of Honor recipient (1920–1944)

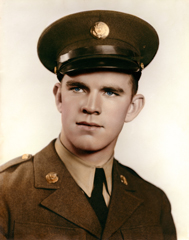
- Dale E Christensen
- Born: May 31, 1920; Cameron Township, Iowa
- Died: August 4, 1944 (aged 24) near Afua islet), Dutch New Guinea
- Burial place: Manila American Cemetery, Taguig, Metro Manila, Philippines
- Military career
- Allegiance: United States of America
- Branch: United States Army
- Service years: 1940 - 1944
- Rank: Second Lieutenant
- Unit: 112th Cavalry Regiment
- Conflicts: World War II
- Awards: Medal of Honor; Purple Heart

Dale Eldon Christensen (May 31, 1920 – August 4, 1944) was a United States Army officer and a recipient of the United States military's highest decoration—the Medal of Honor—for his actions in World War II.

== Biography ==
Christensen joined the Army from Gray, Iowa in October 1940, and by July 16, 1944, was serving as a second lieutenant in Troop E of the 112th Cavalry Regiment during the Battle of Driniumor River. On that day, along the Driniumor River in New Guinea, he single-handedly attacked and silenced an enemy machine gun. Three days later, he reconnoitered an enemy strong point alone, then led his platoon in an assault which successfully destroyed the position. He was killed in action on August 4, while again leading his platoon in an attack against an enemy position. For these actions, he was posthumously awarded the Medal of Honor on May 10, 1945.

Christensen was buried at the Manila American Cemetery in Manila, the Philippines.

== Medal of Honor citation ==
Second Lieutenant Christensen's official Medal of Honor citation reads:

For conspicuous gallantry and intrepidity at the risk of his life above and beyond the call of duty along the Driniumor River, New Guinea, from 16-July 19, 1944. 2d Lt. Christensen repeatedly distinguished himself by conspicuous gallantry above and beyond the call of duty in the continuous heavy fighting which occurred in this area from 16-July 19,. On July 16, his platoon engaged in a savage fire fight in which much damage was caused by 1 enemy machinegun effectively placed. 2d Lt. Christensen ordered his men to remain under cover, crept forward under fire, and at a range of 15 yards put the gun out of action with hand grenades. Again, on July 19, while attacking an enemy position strong in mortars and machineguns, his platoon was pinned to the ground by intense fire. Ordering his men to remain under cover, he crept forward alone to locate definitely the enemy automatic weapons and the best direction from which to attack. Although his rifle was struck by enemy fire and knocked from his hands he continued his reconnaissance, located 5 enemy machineguns, destroyed 1 with hand grenades, and rejoined his platoon. He then led his men to the point selected for launching the attack and, calling encouragement, led the charge. This assault was successful and the enemy was driven from the positions with a loss of 4 mortars and 10 machineguns and leaving many dead on the field. On August 4, 1944, near Afua, Dutch New Guinea, 2d Lt. Christensen was killed in action about 2 yards from his objective while leading his platoon in an attack on an enemy machinegun position. 2d Lt. Christensen's leadership, intrepidity, and repeatedly demonstrated gallantry in action at the risk of his life, above and beyond the call of duty, exemplify the highest traditions of the U.S. Armed Forces.

== See also ==
- List of Medal of Honor recipients
- List of Medal of Honor recipients for World War II
