= Between Heaven and Hell (film) =

1956 film by Richard Fleischer

- Theatrical release lobby card
- Directed by: Richard Fleischer
- Screenplay by: Harry Brown
- Based on: The Day the Century Ended; 1955 novel by Francis Gwaltney
- Produced by: David Weisbart
- Starring: Robert Wagner; Terry Moore; Broderick Crawford; Buddy Ebsen; Robert Keith
- Cinematography: Leo Tover
- Edited by: James B. Clark
- Music by: Hugo Friedhofer
- Color process: Color by DeLuxe
- Production company: 20th Century Fox
- Distributed by: 20th Century Fox
- Release date: October 11, 1956 (New York City)
- Running time: 94 minutes
- Country: United States
- Languages: English; Japanese
- Budget: $1,520,000
- Box office: $2 million (US rentals)

Between Heaven and Hell is a 1956 American Cinemascope war film based on the novel The Day the Century Ended by Francis Gwaltney that the film follows closely. The story is told in flashback format detailing the life of Sam Gifford (Robert Wagner) from his life as a Southern landowner to his war service in the Philippines during World War II.

The film stars Robert Wagner, Terry Moore, and Broderick Crawford, and was directed by Richard Fleischer. It was partly filmed on Kauaʻi. The film's score by Hugo Friedhofer, which included elements of the Dies Irae, was nominated for an Academy Award for Best Scoring of a Dramatic or Comedy Picture at the 29th Academy Awards.

== Plot ==
In 1945, on a Pacific island, Sergeant Sam Gifford is demoted to private after striking an officer. He is transferred to a punishment company, run by the dictatorial Captain Grimes, who insists on being called "Waco" in order to prevent his own death by Japanese snipers. Through flashbacks, we learn Gifford's backstory—his civilian status as a wealthy cotton farmer, hard and uncaring towards his employees, and married to Jenny, the beautiful daughter of his National Guard commander, well-to-do plantation owner Colonel Cousins. After their reserve unit is sent to the Pacific, Gifford becomes close to several of his own sharecroppers—people he never socialized with at home. As a sergeant, Gifford capably leads his platoon, earning a medal for valor. Occasionally, however, Gifford outwardly exhibits signs of fear, battle fatigue, and neurosis. These weaknesses intensify when Colonel Cousins is killed by a sniper. Another officer, Lieutenant Ray Mosby, disdainful of his men both as sharecroppers and as soldiers, machine guns Gifford's friends out of cowardice and panic. Gifford attempts to beat him to death with the butt of his rifle. The flashback ends when Waco calls Gifford into company headquarters.

Waco orders Gifford to lead a patrol to Norzagaray, a town rumored to be Japanese headquarters. On the way, the patrol spots a Japanese mortar platoon heading toward the hills near Waco's headquarters. The patrol continues on and finds the town abandoned. Gifford takes a name plate from the front door of Norzagaray's church as proof they were there. Upon returning, Waco accuses Gifford of loafing and not reaching the town. In reply, Gifford throws the church's name plate on Waco's desk. Then a Japanese mortar barrage commences. Afterwards, Gifford is assigned to outpost duty with a lieutenant nicknamed Little Joe Johnson. There, he forms a friendship with another ex-sharecropper, Corporal Willie Crawford. Gifford admits being hard on those not of his social class. But in making friends with others in his unit, he promises to change. After an attack, the outpost loses radio contact, and Gifford is detailed to company HQ for fresh batteries. He arrives to find Waco has been relieved of command. Before leaving, Waco commends Gifford for the Norzagaray patrol. Wanting to show that he is still an officer, Waco dons his formal Class A uniform including rank insignia. But when he instructs his soldiers to salute him, he is killed by a Japanese sniper.

Gifford returns to the outpost. Later, there is an attack which results in Little Joe's death. Gifford and Crawford are now sole survivors. Crawford, wounded in the leg, orders Gifford back to HQ in order to warn the Company of an impending massive Japanese buildup. At first, Gifford refuses to leave Crawford behind, but Crawford insists. He then aims a pistol at Gifford. Thus, Gifford fights his way through Japanese lines but is wounded along the way. Upon reaching the company, he finds most of the battalion has launched a new offensive. Gifford warns them about the Japanese units massing in the hills and demands they rescue Crawford. Gifford then collapses. After regaining consciousness, he sees a patrol arriving with Crawford on a stretcher. The two wounded comrades are told they are being shipped home. Gifford promises Crawford a new life with his family back home and a job at Gifford's company.

== Cast ==
- Robert Wagner as Private Sam Gifford
- Terry Moore as Jenny Cousins Gifford
- Broderick Crawford as Captain "Waco" Grimes
- Buddy Ebsen as Corporal Willie Crawford
- Robert Keith as Colonel Cousins
- Brad Dexter as Lieutenant Joe "Little Joe" Johnson
- Mark Damon as Private Terry
- Ken Clark as Morgan
- Harvey Lembeck as Private Bernie Meleski
- Skip Homeier as Corporal Swanson
- L. Q. Jones as Private Kenny
- Tod Andrews as Lieutenant Ray Mosby
- Biff Elliot as Lieutenant Tom Thumb
- Bart Burns as Private Raker
- Frank Gerstle as Col. Miles (uncredited)
- Frank Gorshin as Private Millard (uncredited)
- Scatman Crothers as George (uncredited)
- Sam Edwards as Soames (uncredited)
- Carl Switzer as Savage (uncredited)

== Production ==
Arkansas-born Francis Irby Gwaltney soldiered in the Philippines with the 112th Cavalry that served throughout the Pacific doing several amphibious landings. During this service he met and formed a friendship with Norman Mailer.

The Day the Century Ended was Gwaltney's most famous novel. When Fox picked the 1955 novel up for filming, they assigned it to Philippines veteran Rod Serling, famed for his American television plays. Unfortunately, Serling's first screenplay was nine hours long, and the project was given to other writers, notably Harry Brown, who had written the book A Walk in the Sun.

Between Heaven and Hell is one of the 1950s depictions of the US Army that did not paint a recruiting poster image and was more in tune with many soldiers' memories, such as From Here to Eternity, Robert Aldrich's Attack or Samuel Fuller's films.

Fleischer uses the Cinemascope widescreen format well, notably in views of hills lit up by a firefight.

== Reception ==
=== Critical response ===
When the film was first released, The New York Times panned the film, writing, "To be just as blunt about it as Twentieth Century-Fox, Between Heaven and Hell, a World War II drama, lands accordingly, with a pretty dull thud. This curiously rambling, unconvincing and often baffling picture, opening yesterday at Loew's State, very sketchily suggests the regeneration of a hard-headed young G. I. on a Japanese island in the Pacific...Except for the sideline skirmishes with the Japanese, and one fine, big beachhead battle staged by director Richard Fleischer, the action focuses on the outpost, where a brutal, slightly demented company commander, Mr. Crawford, reigns supreme. Mr. Wagner not only manages to survive some snarling comrades, most of whom are wiped out, but also the enemy in a series of lagging, disjointed clashes, verbal and physical, that shed little light on anything or anybody."

== See also ==
- List of American films of 1956
