= Raymond Boyce =

Raymond Boyce may refer to:

- Raymond Boyce (cricketer) (1891–1941), Australian cricketer
- Raymond F. Boyce (1947–1974), American computer scientist
- Raymond Boyce (theatre designer) (1928–2019), New Zealand stage designer, costume designer and puppeteer
