= Boyce Block (Muncie, Indiana) =

- U.S. National Register of Historic Places
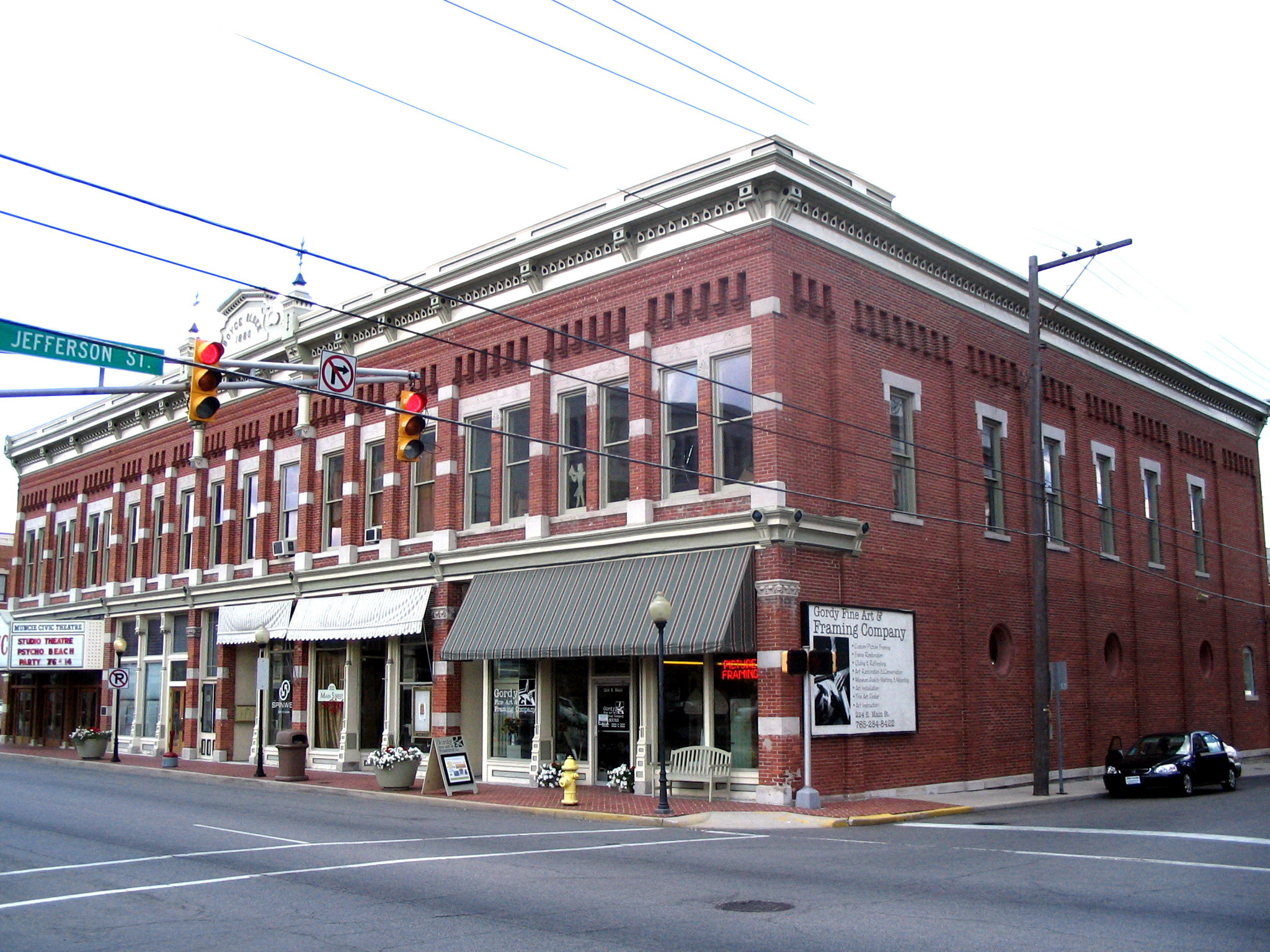
- Boyce Block, July 2007

- Location within Indiana Location within the United States
- Location: 216-224 E. Main St., Muncie, Indiana
- Coordinates: 40°11′37″N 85°23′3″W
- Area: less than one acre
- Built: 1880
- Architect: Grosvernor, Jackson
- NRHP reference No.: 84001015
- Added to NRHP: March 1, 1984

Boyce Block is a historic commercial building located at Muncie, Indiana. It was built in 1880, and is a two-story, brick building. Located in downtown Muncie, Boyce Block was built and named for James A. Boyce, a local businessman and Scottish immigrant. Boyce was a major figure in the Indiana gas boom, which saw rapid industrialization in Muncie. Notably, he convinced the Ball brothers to begin doing business in Muncie (later, through the Ball family's philanthropy, Muncie would gain Ball State University and Minnetrista thanks to this decision). Boyce Block was the first building in Muncie to use electricity and among the first to use gas. In 1890, a fire destroyed the building's interior, but it was swiftly rebuilt. In 1904, the west bays of the building came to house the Star Theater, a vaudeville theater. The Star Theater closed in the 1920s and reopened as the Hoosier Theater (a venue for live shows and films) in 1936, only to close again in 1955. In 1961, the Muncie Civic Theater opened in the spot once occupied by the Star and Hoosier Theaters, and remains open to this day. Various other businesses have occupied other parts of the building over the years. The building also features an elaborate parapet.

It was added to the National Register of Historic Places in 1984.
