= Philip Boyce =

Phil or Philip Boyce may refer to:

- Phil Boyce, American radio executive
- Philip Boyce (bishop) (born 1940), Irish bishop
- Philip Boyce (psychiatrist) (born 1949), Australian psychiatrist
- Philip Boyce (Star Trek), fictional character
