= Michael Boyce =

Michael Boyce may refer to:

- Michael Boyce, Baron Boyce (1943–2022), First Sea Lord of the Royal Navy and Chief of Defence Staff
- Michael Boyce (field hockey) (born 1980), Australian field hockey player
