= Manila American Cemetery =

Overseas military cemetery in Philippines

Manila American Cemetery and Memorial
- American Battle Monuments Commission
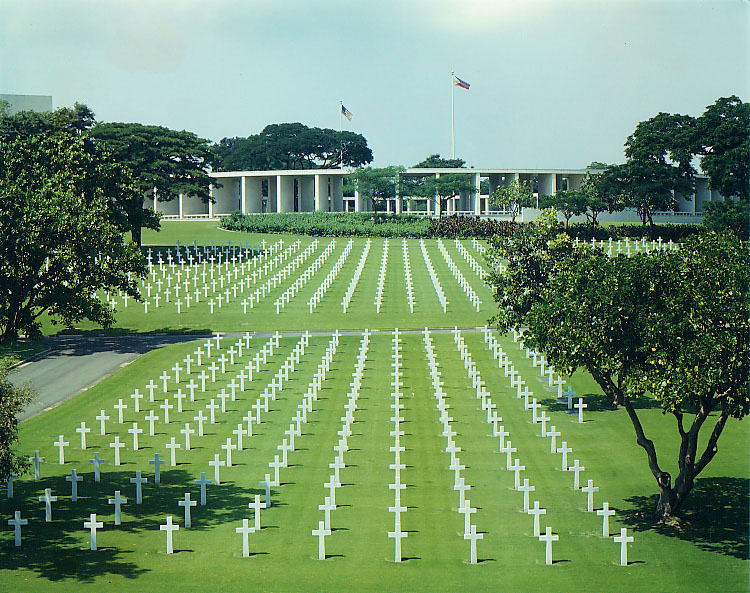
- Manila American Cemetery headstones with memorial building behind.
- Used for those deceased 1941–1945
- Established: 1948
- Location: 14.541°N 121.050°E; Taguig, Philippines
- Designed by: Gardener A. Dailey
- Total burials: 17,206
- Unknowns: 3,744

Burials by nation
- * United States: 16,636: Philippines: 570

Burials by war
- * World War II: 17,206

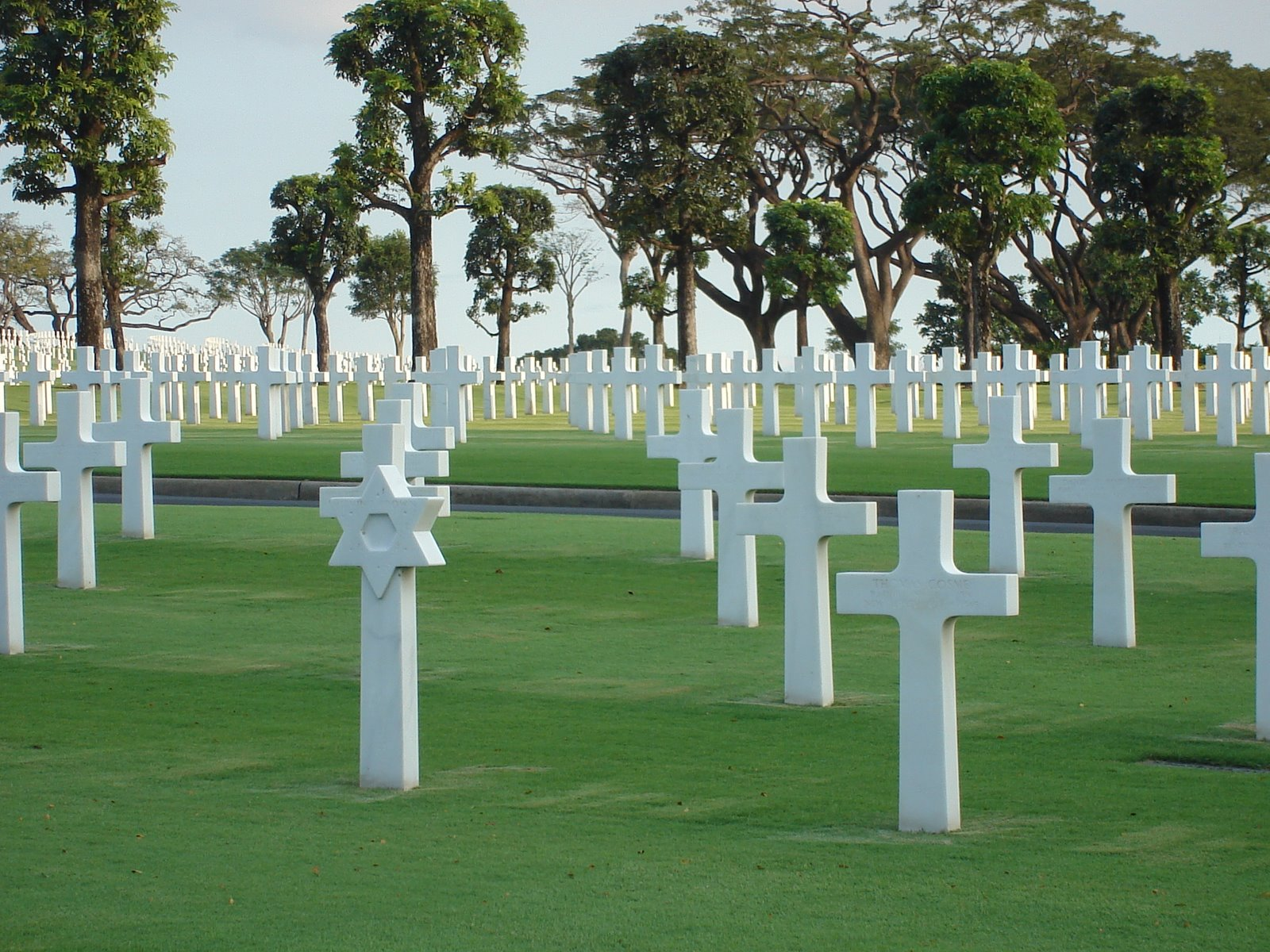
Graves in the cemetery

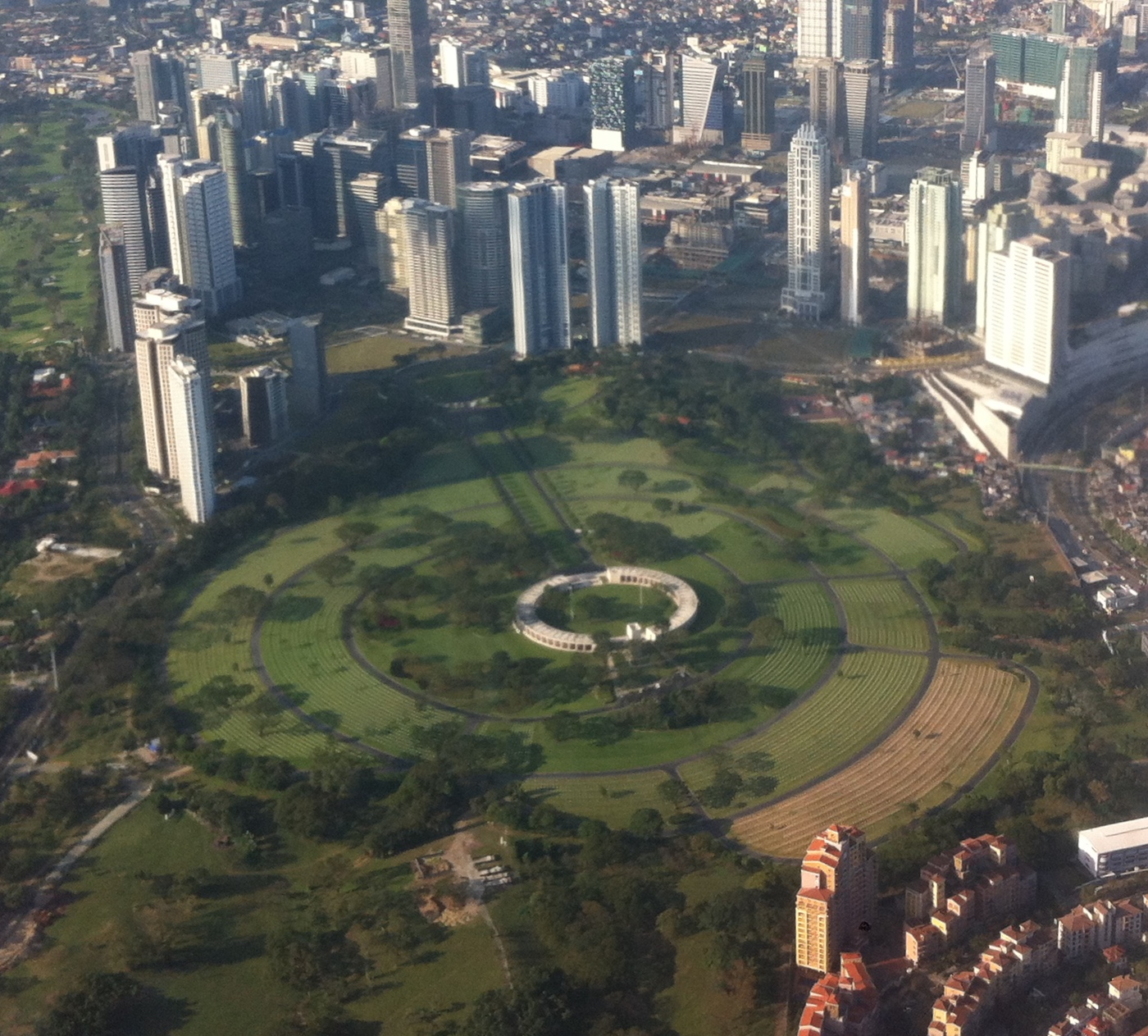
Aerial view of the Manila American Cemetery and Memorial

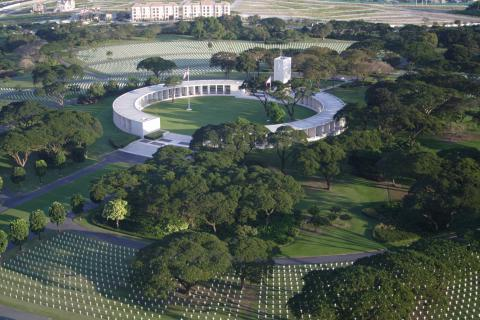
Manila American Cemetery main building

The Manila American Cemetery and Memorial is a military cemetery located in Fort Bonifacio, Taguig. With a total of 17,206 graves, it has the largest number of graves of any cemetery for U.S. personnel killed during World War II and holds war dead from the Philippines and other allied nations. Many of the personnel whose remains are interred or represented were killed in New Guinea, or during the 1941–42 Battle of the Philippines or the Allied recapture of the islands. The headstones are made of Lasa marble which are aligned in eleven plots forming a generally circular pattern, set among a wide variety of tropical trees and shrubbery. The Memorial is maintained by the American Battle Monuments Commission.

The cemetery is open daily to the public from 9:00 a.m. to 5:00 p.m. PHT except December 25 and January 1.

The cemetery also contains one Commonwealth War Dead burial from World War I.

== General layout ==
The entrance to the cemetery is at the far (east) side of the large, grassed circle, which is just beyond the military sentinel's post and intersects with 8th Avenue, 21st Drive, and Old Lawton Avenue. Immediately beyond the gate is the plaza with its circular fountain; at the right is the Visitors' Building. Stretching from the plaza to the memorial is the central mall, which is lined with mahogany trees (Swietenia macrophylla). Circular roads leading eastward and westward through the graves area join the straight roads along the edges of the mall.

== The memorial ==
Twenty-five large mosaic maps in four rooms recall the actions of the United States Armed Forces in the Pacific, China, India and Burma. Carved in the floors are the seals of the American states and its territories.

== Notable burials and memorials ==
Twenty-nine Medal of Honor recipients are buried or memorialized at the Manila cemetery. Also honored are the five Sullivan Brothers, who perished when the light cruiser USS Juneau was sunk in Nov. 1942. A. Peter Dewey (1916–1945), an OSS officer killed in Saigon shortly after World War II ended, is listed on the Tablets of the Missing. The Camp O'Donnell Memorial is dedicated to the memory of the "Battling Bastards of Bataan".

=== Medal of Honor recipients ===
- Burials
  - Dale Eldon Christensen (1920–1944), for action in New Guinea in July 1944
  - Leroy Johnson (1919–1944), for action at Leyte, Philippines
  - Charles E. Mower (1924–1944), for action at Leyte, Philippines
  - Robert A. Owens (1920–1943), for action at Bougainville
  - Charles H. Roan (1923–1944), for action at Peleliu Island, Palau
  - William H. Thomas (1923–1945), for action in the Zambales Mountains, Luzon, Philippines
  - Louis J. Van Schaick (1875–1945), for action against Philippine insurgents in 1901
- Cenotaphs and memorial listings
  - Lewis Kenneth Bausell (1924–1944), for action at Peleliu
  - Daniel J. Callaghan (1890–1942), for action as commanding officer in the Battle of Guadalcanal
  - George F. Davis (1911–1945), for action in the invasion of Lingayen Gulf
  - Samuel D. Dealey (1906–1944), for action off of Luzon
  - Ernest E. Evans (1908–1944), for action commanding USS Johnston in the Battle off Samar
  - Elmer E. Fryar (1914–1944), for action at Leyte, Philippines
  - Howard W. Gilmore (1902–1943), for action in the Southwest Pacific
  - Robert M. Hanson (1920–1944), for action at Bougainville and New Britain Islands
  - Alexander R. Nininger Jr. (1918–1942), for action at Bataan
  - Harl Pease (1917–1942), for action over New Guinea
  - Oscar V. Peterson (1899–1942), for action aboard USS Neosho
  - Milton E. Ricketts (1913–1942), for action aboard USS Yorktown in the Battle of the Coral Sea
  - Albert H. Rooks (1891–1942), for action commanding USS Houston
  - Norman Scott (1889–1942), for action as second in command in the Battle of Guadalcanal
  - Kenneth N. Walker (1898–1943), for actions commanding the USAAF 5th Bomber Command in the South Pacific Theater
  - George Watson (1915–1943), for action near New Guinea
  - Raymond H. Wilkins (1917–1943), for action at Simpson Harbor, Rabaul, New Britain
  - Cassin Young (1894–1942), for action commanding USS Vestal during the attack on Pearl Harbor

=== Other notable people ===
- Rear Admiral Theodore E. Chandler (1894–1945), U.S. Navy, Navy Cross for action aboard USS Louisville in the Invasion of Lingayen Gulf
- Major General Edwin D. Patrick (1894–1945), U.S. Army, Distinguished Service Cross for action in the Philippines. Killed in Action.
- Brigadier General James Dalton II (1910–1945), U.S. Army, Distinguished Service Cross for action in the New Guinea campaign. (Dalton was killed in action at the Battle of Balete Pass in Luzon, Philippines.)
- Lieutenant Commander Hilan Ebert (1903–1942), U.S. Navy, Navy Cross for action aboard USS Northampton in the Battle of Guadalcanal.
