= Lola Boyce =

American mechanical engineer

Lola Boyce (born 1944) is an American mechanical engineer whose research concerns mechanical fatigue and strength degradation in materials for nuclear and aerospace applications.

== Education and career ==
Boyce was born on December 10, 1944, in Bay Shore, New York; her father was aerospace engineer Richard Bennett (1918–2002). After attending several other universities, she studied mechanical engineering at Texas A&M University, earning a bachelor's degree in 1973, a master's degree, in 1975, and in 1980 a Ph.D. Her dissertation, Probabilistic Analysis of Foundation Forces for a Class of Unbalanced Rotating Machines, was supervised by Thomas J. Kozik.

She worked for three years in the Nuclear Test Engineering Division at Lawrence Livermore National Laboratory, and then joined the mechanical engineering department at the University of Texas at San Antonio in 1983, eventually becoming full professor and department chair there. Her activities at the university included founding the "Extending Your Horizons" conference, focused on encouraging young women in technology.

In 1998–1999 she was associate dean of graduate studies and research at Mercer University, at the same time co-founding Boyce Turbine Engine Control (later BTEC Turbines), where she worked as vice president and director of engineering until 2008. Since 2008 she has continued in engineering as a business consultant.

== Recognition ==
Boyce has been listed in the Academy of Distinguished Graduates of the Texas A&M University Department of Mechanical Engineering. In 1992 she was elected as an ASME Fellow.
