= Charles Boyce (footballer) =

Scottish footballer

Personal information
- Full name: Charles Hislop Boyce
- Date of birth: 6 January 1899
- Place of birth: Cathcart, Scotland
- Date of death: 6 August 1964 (aged 65)
- Place of death: Killearn, Scotland
- Position: Inside right

Senior career*
Years	Team	Apps	(Gls)
1915–1917	Queen's Park	13	(0)
- * Club domestic league appearances and goals

Charles Hislop Boyce (6 January 1899 – 6 August 1964) was a Scottish amateur footballer who played in the Scottish Football League for Queen's Park as an inside right.

== Personal life ==
Boyce served as a lieutenant in the Royal Engineers during the First World War and was honourably discharged due to wounds or sickness in 1916. After the war, he worked as a Civil Defence Engineer for the Glasgow Corporation.

== Career statistics ==
Appearances and goals by club, season and competition
Club	Season	League			National Cup		Other		Total	
Club	Season	Division	Apps	Goals	Apps	Goals	Apps	Goals	Apps	Goals
Queen's Park	1915–16	Scottish First Division	10	0	―		0	0	10	0
Queen's Park	1916–17	Scottish First Division	3	0	―		0	0	3	0
Career total			13	0	0	0	0	0	13	0
