= Jill Boyce =

American video engineer

Jill MacDonald Boyce is an American video engineer known for her work on video compression, immersive video, and the standardization of video formats. Formerly director of algorithms at Vidyo, vice president for research and innovation at Thomson Multimedia, chief media architect and Intel Fellow at Intel, and co-founder and co-CEO of immersive video startup Vimmerse, she is Distinguished Scientist at Nokia.

Boyce majored in electrical engineering at the University of Kansas, graduating in 1988 as the university's Outstanding Senior in Electrical Engineering. She earned a master's degree in electrical engineering from Princeton University in 1990.

She was elected as an IEEE Fellow, in the 2019 class of fellows, "for contributions to video coding". In 2021 she was a recipient of the University of Kansas's Distinguished Engineering Service Award.
