= Adolphe Lippig Boyce =

American physician

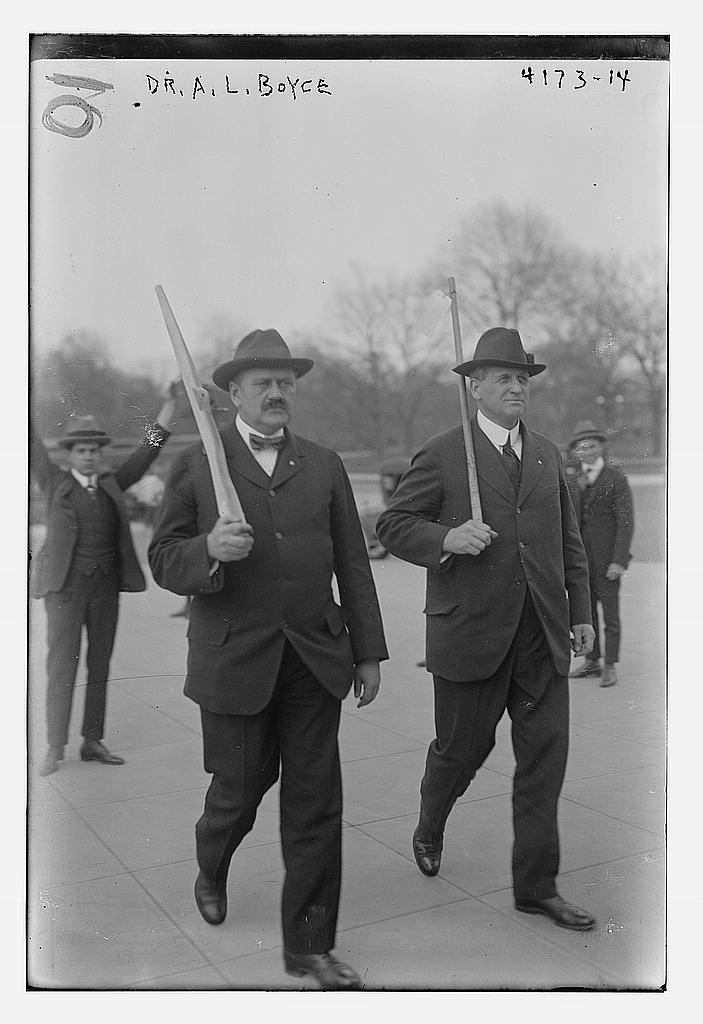
Boyce in 1917

Major Adolphe Lippig Boyce, M.D. (1866 – 1955) was the commander of Boyce's Tigers, a paramilitary group. He trained civilians on Governor's Island prior to World War I and New York City Center prior to World War II.
