= James Boyce (Louisiana politician) =

American businessman and politician (1922–1990)

James Harvey "Jimmy" Boyce Sr.

State Chairman of the Louisiana Republican Party
- In office 1972–1976
- Preceded by: Charles deGravelles
- Succeeded by: John H. Cade, Jr.

Personal details
- Born: October 6, 1922 Carrollton, Carroll County; Missouri, USA
- Died: May 15, 1990 (aged 67) Baton Rouge, Louisiana
- Resting place: Greenoaks Memorial Park in Baton Rouge
- Spouse: Katherine Jane Thibaut Boyce (married c. 1942 – 1990, his death)
- Children: 3
- Parent(s): Clarence George and Nora Leota Clark Boyce
- Education: Baton Rouge High School Culver Military Academy Louisiana State University (one year)
- Occupation: Businessman

Military service
- Branch/service: United States Navy pilot (1942–1943)
- Battles/wars: World War II

James Harvey Boyce Sr., known as Jimmy Boyce (October 6, 1922 – May 15, 1990) was Louisiana businessman and politician, who chaired the Louisiana Republican Party from 1972 to 1976.

== Background ==
Born in Carrollton, Missouri, he graduated from Baton Rouge High School and attended Culver Military Academy in Culver, Indiana, and for a year, Louisiana State University.

Boyce served as a United States Navy pilot during World War II, and later worked for Caterpillar Company.

Boyce married Katherine Jane Thibaut, with whom he had three sons.

Boyce attended the 1964 Republican National Convention in San Francisco, as an alternate delegate.

Boyce died in 1990, at the age of 67.

Preceded by Charles deGravelles	State Chairman of the Louisiana Republican Party; 1972–1976	Succeeded by John H. Cade Jr.
