= D. G. Boyce =

Northern Irish historian

David George Boyce
- Born: 1942 (age 83–84); Belfast
- Died: 2020

Academic background
- Education: Lurgan College
- Alma mater: Queen's University Belfast
- Thesis: British public opinion and government policy in Ireland, 1918-1922 (1969)

Academic work
- Discipline: History
- Sub-discipline: Irish history
- Institutions: Swansea University

David George Boyce (1942–2020), also known as George Boyce, was a Northern Irish historian who specialised in Irish history.

He was educated at Lurgan College in County Armagh and at Queen's University Belfast. He worked in the Department of Manuscripts at the Bodleian Library in Oxford until 1971. From 1971 until 2004 he was a lecturer in the Department of Politics and International relations at Swansea University. He was also a fellow of the Royal Historical Society.

He contributed 15 articles to the Oxford Dictionary of National Biography.

His death occurred on 17 August 2020. His funeral service was held in Swansea, but his ashes were interred in County Down in 2021.

== Books ==
- Englishmen and Irish Troubles: British Public Opinion and the Making of Irish Policy 1918-1922 (1972).
- (editor with James Curran and Pauline Wingate) Newspaper History from the Seventeenth Century to the Present Day (1978).
- Nationalism in Ireland (1st ed 1982; 2nd ed 1991; 3rd ed 1995).
- (editor), The Revolution in Ireland, 1879-1923 (1987).
- The Crisis of British Unionism: The Domestic Papers of the Second Earl of Selborne, 1885-1922 (1987).
- The Crisis of British Power: The Imperial and Naval Papers of the Second Earl of Selborne, 1895-1910 (1987).
- Nineteenth-Century Ireland: The Search for Stability (1990).
- (editor), Parnell in Perspective (1991).
- Ireland 1828 - 1923: From Ascendancy to Democracy (1992).
- (editor), Political Thought in Ireland Since the Seventeenth Century (1993).
- The Irish Question and British Politics, 1868-1996 (1996).
- The Making of Modern Irish History (1996).
- Decolonisation and the British Empire 1775-1997 (1999).
- Defenders of the Union: A Survey of British and Irish Unionism Since 1801 (2000).
- (editor), Political Discourse in Seventeenth- and Eighteenth-Century Ireland (2001).
- (editor), Problems and Perspectives in Irish History Since 1800 (2004).
- Ireland in Transition, 1867-1921 (2004).
- (editor), The Ulster Crisis: 1885-1921 (2005).
- The Falklands War (2005).
- (editor), Gladstone and Ireland: Politics, Religion and Nationality in the Victorian Age (2011).
