= George W. G. Boyce Jr. =

United States Army Medal of Honor recipient (1916–1944)

- Born: October 10, 1916; New York City, New York
- Died: July 23, 1944 (aged 27) near Afua, Dutch New Guinea
- Burial place: Manila American Cemetery, Manila, the Philippines
- Military career
- Allegiance: United States of America
- Branch: United States Army
- Rank: Second Lieutenant
- Unit: 112th Cavalry Regimental Combat Team
- Conflicts: World War II
- Awards: Medal of Honor; Purple Heart

George W. G. Boyce Jr. (October 10, 1916 – July 23, 1944) was a United States Army officer and a recipient of the United States military's highest decoration—the Medal of Honor—for his actions in World War II.

== Biography ==
Boyce joined the Army from the Town of Cornwall, New York, and by July 23, 1944, was serving as a second lieutenant in the 112th Cavalry Regimental Combat Team. On that day, near Afua, Dutch New Guinea, he smothered the blast of an enemy-thrown hand grenade with his own body, sacrificing himself to protect those around him. For this action, he was posthumously awarded the Medal of Honor nine months later, on April 7, 1945.

Boyce was buried at the Manila American Cemetery in Manila, the Philippines.

== Medal of Honor citation ==
Second Lieutenant Boyce's official Medal of Honor citation reads:

For conspicuous gallantry and intrepidity at risk of his life above and beyond the call of duty near Afua, New Guinea, on 23 July 1944. 2d Lt. Boyce's troop, having been ordered to the relief of another unit surrounded by superior enemy forces, moved out, and upon gaining contact with the enemy, the two leading platoons deployed and built up a firing line. 2d Lt. Boyce was ordered to attack with his platoon and make the main effort on the right of the troop. He launched his attack but after a short advance encountered such intense rifle, machinegun, and mortar fire that the forward movement of his platoon was temporarily halted. A shallow depression offered a route of advance and he worked his squad up this avenue of approach in order to close with the enemy. He was promptly met by a volley of hand grenades, 1 falling between himself and the men immediately following. Realizing at once that the explosion would kill or wound several of his men, he promptly threw himself upon the grenade and smothered the blast with his own body. By thus deliberately sacrificing his life to save those of his men, this officer exemplified the highest traditions of the U.S. Armed Forces.

== Honored in ship naming ==
The United States Army ship USAT Lt. George W. G. Boyce which operated in the Pacific Ocean at the end of World War II was named in his honor.

== See also ==
- List of Medal of Honor recipients for World War II
