= William Binnington Boyce =

English missionary (1804–1889)

- Born: November 9, 1804; Beverley, Yorkshire, England
- Died: March 8, 1889 (aged 84); Glebe, New South Wales, Australia
- Burial place: Rookwood Cemetery
- Education: University of Hull
- Occupation: Methodist missionary
- Employer: Wesleyan Missionary Society

William Binnington Boyce (9 November 1804 – 8 March 1889) was an English Methodist missionary, philologist, author, and clergyman. He worked for the Wesleyan Missionary Society in South Africa, where he identified the syntax of Bantu languages. Later, he oversaw the establishment of the Wesleyan's Australian Conference and was a founding member of the University of Sydney's senate. He was also a general secretary of the British Conference of the Wesleyan Missionary Society.

== Early life ==
Boyce was born in Beverley, Yorkshire, England, on 9 November 1804. He was raised by his grandmother until he was six years old; at that time, he lived with an aunt. His maternal relatives were Wesleyans.

Boyce attended the University of Hull where he studied commerce. In 1829, he decided to become a minister and was ordained by the British Conference of the Wesleyan Missionary Society.

== Career ==
Boyce was appointed to serve as a missionary in Burtingvale in South Africa. He worked with the Xhosa of the eastern Cape Colony. He had a talent for philology and was the first to identify the grammar and syntax of Bantu languages. He published A Grammar of the Kafir Language in 1834. That same year, he also published the Gospel of Luke in the Xhosa language, with fellow missionary William Shaw. He was active in South African frontier affairs between 1834 and 1843, supporting the English settlers over the Africans

Boyce returned to England in 1843 and served at Bolton, Lancashire from 1843 to 1845. He was sent to Sydney, Australia in 1846 as the general superintendent of the Wesleyan's Australian Conference, overseeing the establishment of missions in Australia, Fiji, the Friendly Islands, and Van Diemen's Land. He was also charged with acquiring building sites and recruiting new ministers to serve at the new missions.

In August 1847, Boyce started editing and publishing the Gleaner, a weekly publication devoted to good literature. He was a founding member of the University of Sydney's senate, serving from 1851 to 1859. He also helped establish the university's library, contributing many books. In 1855, the British Conference elected Boyce the first president of the Wesleyan Missionary Society's Australian Conference. He was re-elected at a conference in Melbourne in 1856. In this capacity, he traveled to London, where he addressed mission secretaries.

Boyce became a general secretary of the British Conference of the Wesleyan Missionary Society in 1858. He presided over the society's first conference in Eastern British America in 1861. In 1871, Boyce returned to Sydney but maintained his membership in the British Conference. He also wrote books on various topics. After he retired in 1876, he remained in Australia, where he preached in the Toxteth Park Chapel in Glebe, a suburb of Sydney.

== Personal life ==
Boyce married Maria Bowden in 1834. She was the daughter of James Bowden, who was a merchant in Hull. They had four daughters. His family traveled with him to South Africa and Australia. After Maria died, he married Jane Elizabeth Pitman in 1873. She was the daughter of the Hon. George Allen.

Boyce donated 2,000 books from his personal library to the Stanmore Wesleyan Theological Institute.

Boyce died 8 March 1889 at his residence in Glebe, New South Wales. He was buried in Rookwood Cemetery in Sydney.

== Selected publications ==
- A Grammar of the Kafir Language. Grahamstown, 1834.
- A Grammar of the Kafir Language. 2nd edition. London: Wesleyan Missionary Society, 1844.
- Notes on South African Affairs from 1834 to 1838. With Reference to the Civil, Political, and Religious Condition of the Colonists and Aborigines. London: Graham's Town, 1838.
- A Brief Grammar of Modern Geography: For the Use of Schools. Sydney: R. Barr, 1852.
- Statistics of Protestant Missionary Societies 1872-3. London, William Nichols, 1874.
- Six Lectures on the Higher Criticism Upon the Old Testament. Sydney: Joseph Cook & Company, 1878.
- The Higher Criticism and the Bible: A Manual for Students. London: Wesleyan Conference Office, 1881.
- Introduction to the Study of History: Civil, Ecclesiastical, and Literary. London: Theophilus Woolmer, 1884.

== See also ==
- John McKendree Springer
- William Taylor (bishop)
