= SS Nieuw Amsterdam (1937) =

Dutch transatlantic liner and cruise ship

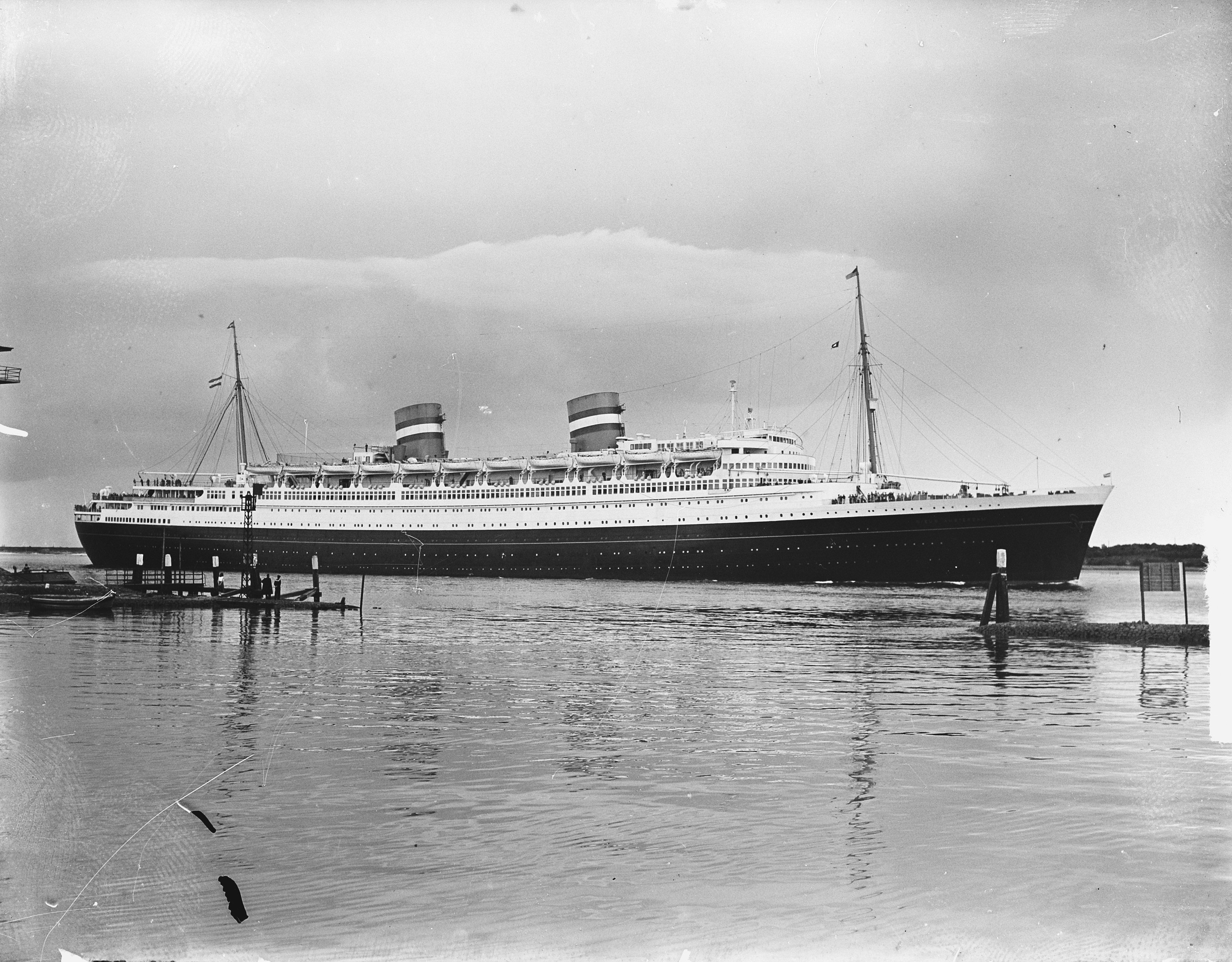
- Nieuw Amsterdam at Hook of Holland in 1949

History

Netherlands
- Name: Nieuw Amsterdam
- Namesake: New Amsterdam
- Owner: NASM
- Operator: Holland America Line
- Port of registry: Rotterdam
- Route: 1938–39: Rotterdam – Hoboken; 1939: Hoboken – Hamilton, Bermuda; 1947–71: Rotterdam – Hoboken
- Ordered: 1935
- Builder: Rotterdamsche Droogdok Maatschappij. Rotterdam
- Cost: 20 million guilders
- Yard number: 200
- Laid down: January 3, 1936
- Launched: April 10, 1937
- Completed: April 23, 1938
- Maiden voyage: May 10, 1938
- Out of service: 1973
- Refit: 1947, 1961
- Identification: IMO number: 5251719; call sign PGGF
- Nickname(s): "Darling of the Dutch"
- Fate: Scrapped 1974

General characteristics
- Type: Ocean liner
- Tonnage: 8,735 DWT; 1938: 36,287 GRT, 21,496 NRT; 1948: 36,667 GRT, 21,744 NRT; 1962: 36,982 GRT
- Length: 758 ft (231 m) overall; 713.7 ft (217.5 m) registered
- Beam: 88.3 ft (26.9 m)
- Draft: 31 ft 6 in (9.60 m)
- Depth: 50.0 ft (15.2 m)
- Decks: 5
- Installed power: 8,116 NHP, 34,620 ihp
- Propulsion: 2 × Propellers; Single reduction gearing; 8 × Steam turbines
- Speed: 20 knots (37 km/h; 23 mph) service; 21.5 knots (39.8 km/h; 24.7 mph) On sea trials
- Capacity: passengers, 1938: 556 × 1st class, 455 × 2nd class, 209 × 3rd class; passengers, 1962: 301 to 690 × 1st class, 583 to 972 × tourist class; cargo: 272,000 cu ft (7,700 m^{3}) grain; 253,000 cu ft (7,200 m^{3}) bale; 17,633 cu ft (499.3 m^{3}) refrigerated
- Troops: 6,800
- Crew: 700
- Sensors & processing systems: 1938: Wireless direction finding, echo sounding device, gyrocompass; 1946: As above, plus radar
- Armament: in Second World War: 36 guns

SS Nieuw Amsterdam was a Dutch transatlantic ocean liner that was built in 1938 and scrapped in 1974. She was the second Holland America Line (Nederlandsch-Amerikaansche Stoomvaart Maatschappij, or NASM) ship to be named after the former Dutch colony of New Amsterdam, now New York.

When new, Nieuw Amsterdam was the largest and swiftest ship in NASM's fleet, the largest ship in the Dutch merchant fleet, and the largest ship ever built in the Netherlands. She succeeded Statendam as NASM's flagship. She was the Netherlands' "ship of state", just as Normandie was for France, Queen Mary was for the United Kingdom, and Rex was for Italy.

Her peacetime career, both before and after the Second World War, was seasonal. She made transatlantic crossings between Rotterdam and Hoboken, New Jersey from about April to December, and cruises from about December to April. She cruised from NASM's terminal in Hoboken, mostly to the Caribbean. She twice cruised around South America: the first time early in 1939, and the second time early in 1950.

From 1940 to 1946 Nieuw Amsterdam was an Allied troopship. She served mostly in and around the Indian Ocean, but also in the Atlantic, and occasionally in the Pacific.

By 1969 she had started cruising from Port Everglades, Florida. In 1971, she ceased scheduled transatlantic services and was employed solely for cruising. She was withdrawn at the end of 1973, and scrapped in Taiwan in 1974.

== Building ==
NASM originally planned to call the ship Prinsendam; a name the company had not used before. However, during her construction NASM changed this to Nieuw Amsterdam. The company's previous Nieuw Amsterdam was launched in 1905 and scrapped in 1932. It had been its flagship until Rotterdam was completed in 1908.

Rotterdamsche Droogdok Maatschappij built the new ship in Rotterdam for 20 million guilders as yard number 200. She was laid down on January 3, 1936; launched by Queen Wilhelmina on April 10, 1937; and completed on April 23, 1938.

Nieuw Amsterdam's lengths were 758 ft (231 m) overall and 713.7 ft (217.5 m) registered. Her beam was 88.3 ft (26.9 m) and her depth was 50.0 ft (15.2 m). She was the largest ship NASM had ever ordered. All of her dimensions were bigger than those of Justicia, which NASM had ordered before the First World War as Statendam, but which the United Kingdom had requisitioned as a troopship, and then lost to enemy action.

Koninklijke Maatschappij De Schelde built Nieuw Amsterdam's six water-tubed Schelde-Yarrow boilers and eight steam turbines. The boilers had a combined heating surface of 51,000 square feet (4,700 m^{2}), and supplied steam at 625 psi. Her turbines were in four pairs: high-pressure, low-pressure, and two stages of intermediate pressure. She had twin screws, each driven by four turbines via single reduction gearing. She had two funnels.

The combined power of her eight turbines was rated at 8,116 NHP or 34,620 ihp. On her sea trials in March 1938 she achieved 21.5 knots (39.8 km/h). Her service speed was 20 knots (37 km/h).

Nieuw Amsterdam had berths for 1,220 passengers: 556 in first class, 455 in second class and 209 in third class. Her holds had capacity for 272,000 cu ft (7,700 m^{3}) of grain or 253,000 cu ft (7,200 m^{3}) of baled cargo. 17,633 cu ft (499.3 m^{3}) of her holds were refrigerated.

When new, Niew Amsterdam was better protected against fire than any other ship afloat. She also had the largest proportion of cabins with ensuite bathrooms, and the largest air conditioning plant of any ship. She was first ocean liner to have an air-conditioned theater.

== Interior ==
First-class dining saloon

Her design was Art Deco inside and out. Huibert Prins designed her, and 15 architects and 50 artists worked on her décor, including Leen Bolle, Adriaan Lubbers, Reijer Stolk, Siem van den Hoonaard and Frits van Hall. The interior was spacious, and had fluorescent lighting, aluminum motifs, and light, pastel colors throughout. The ship had an understated elegance that made her a favorite among seasoned transatlantic passengers.

The First Class dining saloon had columns covered in gold leaf, tinted mirrors, ivory walls, satinwood furniture, and a Moroccan leather ceiling with Murano glass light fixtures. Like the First Class dining saloon of Normandie, it had no portholes or windows to the sea, and relied solely on artificial lighting. There were four escalators for stewards to use when serving the cabin class and tourist class dining saloons.

There was a First Class smoking room with Circassian walnut paneling and deep armchairs and settees. The smoking room had a bar, and was flanked by two enclosed sun verandas extending to the sides of the ship.

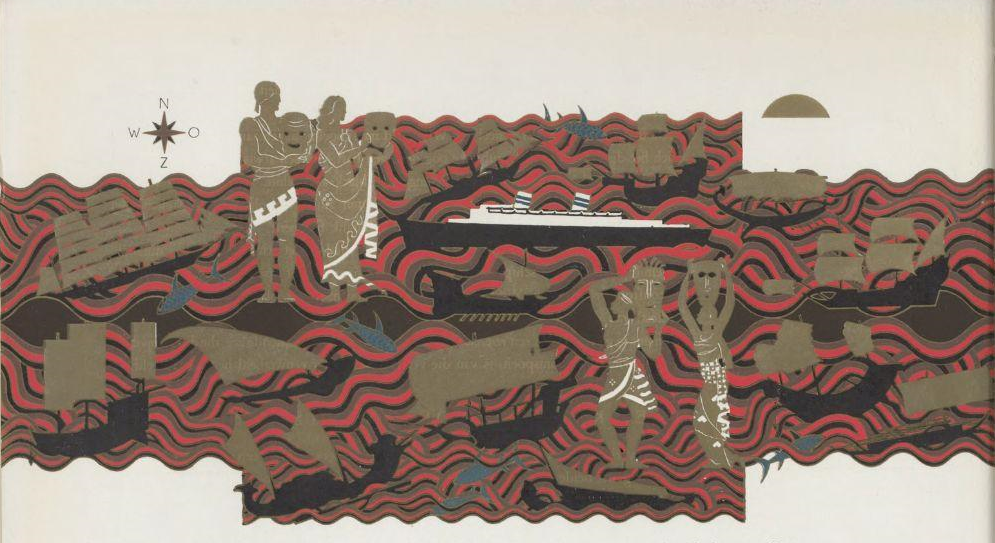
Lacquered panel by Reijer Stolk at the entrance to the theater

Nieuw Amsterdam was the second ship in the world after Normandie to have a theater. Its deeply cushioned seats had an unobstructed view of the stage. The auditorium was egg-shaped, using the latest scientific sound-proofing materials and amplifying equipment for high-quality acoustics for concerts, drama, and pre-release motion pictures.

The ship had two swimming pools: one outdoors, and the other indoors on E-deck, with Delftware tiling.

First Class cabins ranged in size from single-berths to elaborate cabins-de-luxe. Nieuw Amsterdam was the first ship on which all First Class cabins had an en-suite bathroom.

== Pre-war career ==
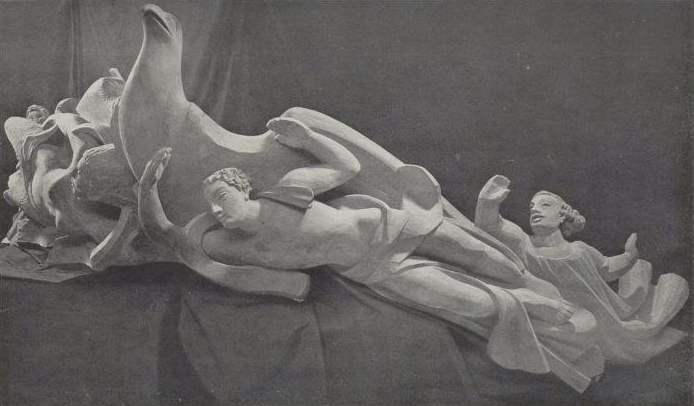
Sculpture by Frits van Hall, in the cabin class aft vestibule

Nieuw Amsterdam began her sea trials on March 21, carrying 350 guests. The trip included a call at Boulogne, and got back to Rotterdam on March 24. Her builders handed her over to NASM on April 23. She was registered at Rotterdam, and her wireless telegraph call sign was PGGF.

Nieuw Amsterdam worked NASM's route between Rotterdam and Hoboken, New Jersey. Westbound voyages included calls at Boulogne and Southampton, and eastbound voyages included calls at Plymouth and Boulogne.

She began her maiden voyage from Rotterdam on May 10, 1938. On May 16 she reached Hoboken 10 hours early, having averaged 21.7 knots (40.2 km/h) from Southampton to Hoboken. At Hoboken she landed 537 passengers, including 50 reporters from the Nieuwe Rotterdamsche Courant. She began her return voyage from Hoboken on May 21, called at Plymouth on May 27, and continued to Rotterdam.

Nieuw Amsterdam was variously acclaimed as the "Ship of the Year" or "Ship of Tomorrow". She was neither as large nor as fast as the foremost British, French, German or Italian transatlantic liners, but she won a loyal clientele. She and her running-mate Statendam were among the few profitable liners of the 1930s. On June 11, 1938 Nieuw Amsterdam left Hoboken carrying 850 passengers. On July 2 she left Hoboken with 1,144 passengers, including 485 in cabin class. On July 23 she left Hoboken with 852 passengers, including 410 in cabin class. The latter were reported to be "the largest cabin figures on any ship in recent weeks".

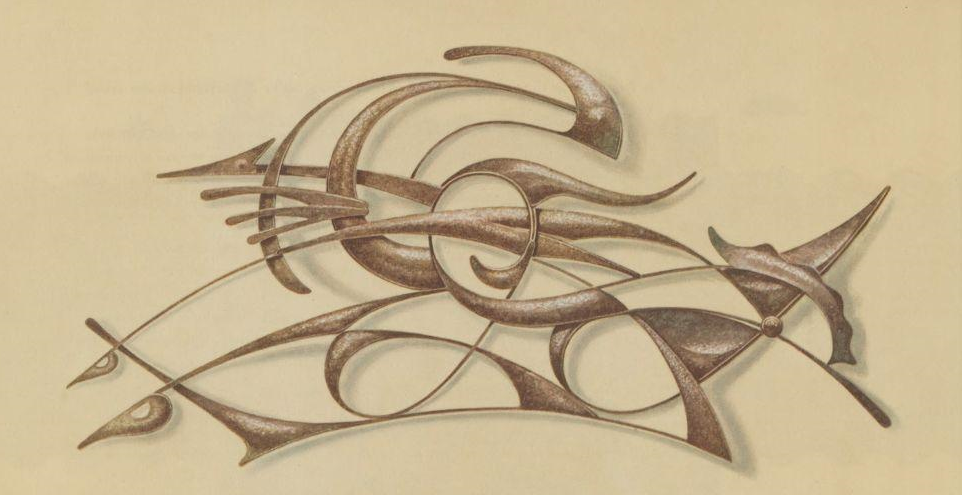
"De Snelheid van den Wind" ("The Speed of the Wind") by Siem van den Hoonaard, in the vestibule of the tourist class promenade deck

On July 30, 1938 Nieuw Amsterdam became the first ship to subscribe to a new service from the Radiomarine Corporation of America, an RCA subsidiary. A market index of 40 representative stocks would be radioed to participating ships three times a day, for passengers who wished to be kept informed of stock prices. On December 25, NASM announced that 12 electric eyes would be installed, to operate automatic door-openers at the entrances and exits of the escalators used by stewards serving the dining saloons, in order to speed up service.

Transatlantic passenger traffic was seasonal, so Nieuw Amsterdam went cruising from mid-December 1938 to the end of March 1939. She made three cruises: two to Rio de Janeiro, followed by one circumnavigating South America. On December 17, 1938, she left Hoboken for Rio de Janeiro via Curaçao and La Guaira. She returned via Salvador, Bahia, arriving back in Hoboken on January 12, 1939. On January 14 she left Hoboken on her second cruise to Rio de Janeiro, arriving back in Hoboken on February 9, 1939. On February 11, 1939, she left Hoboken on her 48-day cruise around South America. She covered 14,000 nautical miles (26,000 km), and arrived back in Hoboken with 575 passengers on March 29.

== Crisis in Europe ==
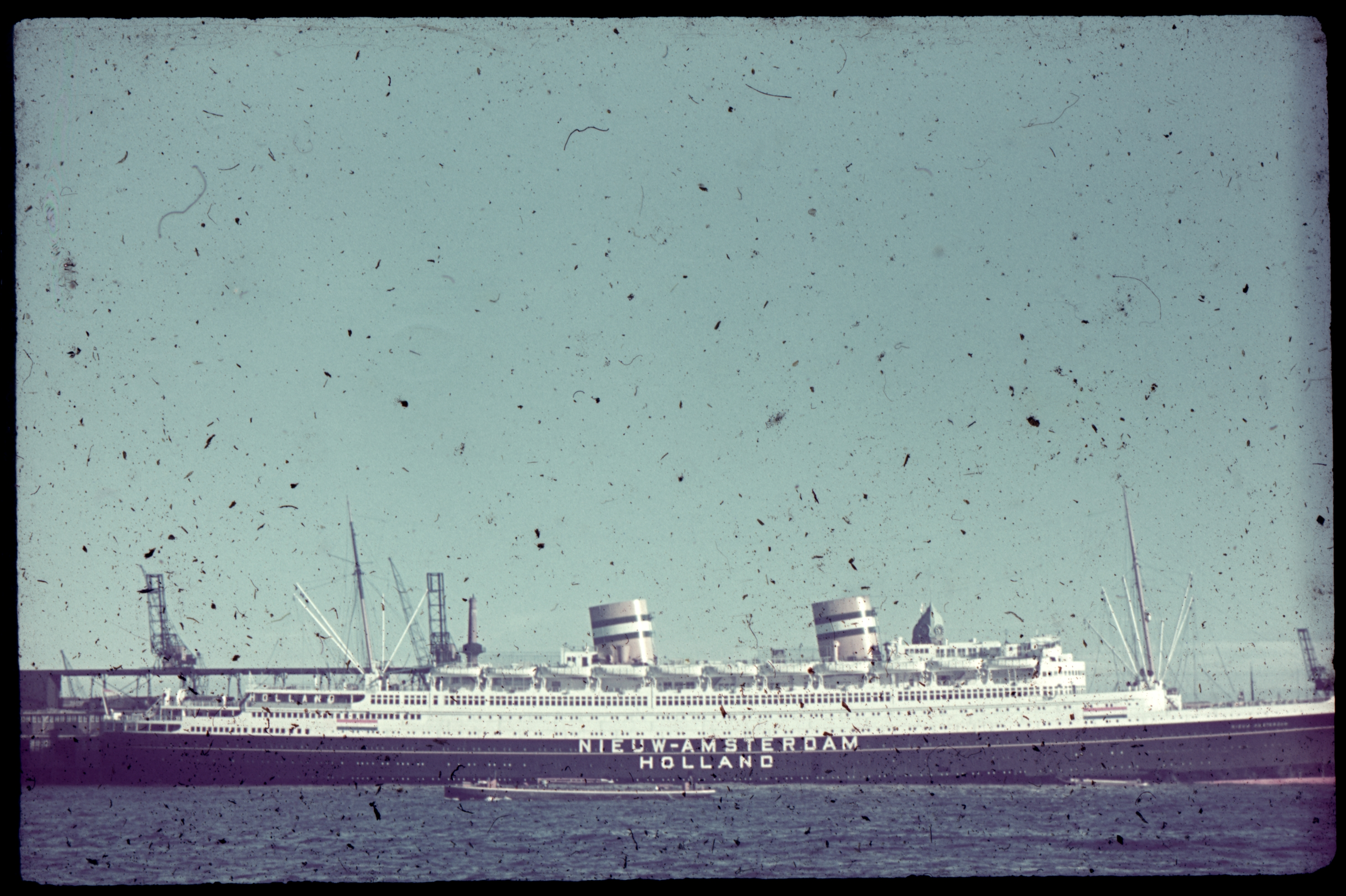
Nieuw Amsterdam in Rotterdam, with her name and nationality painted on the side of her hull to identify her as a neutral ship

On September 1, 1939, Germany invaded Poland. On the same day, Nieuw Amsterdam reached Hoboken carrying 1,286 passengers. This was 150 more than her capacity, and included a number of refugees. One was the Jewish businessman Arnold Bernstein, whom Nazi Germany had imprisoned, and forced to forfeit his shipping line in return for his release. NASM accommodated 26 women passengers in the children's playroom, 16 in the ship's hospital and six in the officers' mess. 14 male passengers were accommodated in the engineers' mess. Furniture was removed and mattresses laid on floors for them.

On September 5 Nieuw Amsterdam left Hoboken. She was due in Rotterdam on September 13, but the United Kingdom and France were blockading Germany, so on September 11 the Royal Navy arrested her in the English Channel. She joined other ships detained at The Downs anchorage, waiting to be inspected for contraband. The Navy found in her cargo a consignment of 1,500 tons of copper, which one of her passengers had bought in the US for Germany. The Dutch government agreed to assume title of the copper, to avoid the British seizing it. The Navy arrested two tourist class passengers as alleged German spies, and interned 34 German stewards and crew members. One of the alleged spies tried to kill himself. The ship was released on September 14 to complete her voyage.

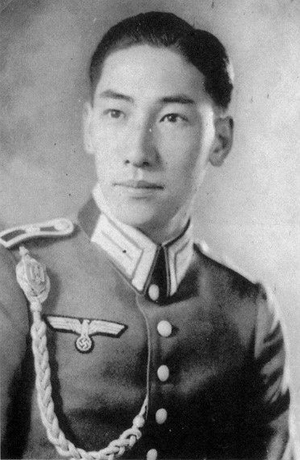
Chiang Wei-kuo in German Army uniform

On September 6, NASM gave Nieuw Amsterdam's crew a 15 percent pay rise. However, after she reached Rotterdam her crew went on strike for hazard pay. The dispute was settled on September 20, but by then 200 prospective passengers had canceled their reservations. As a result, on this crossing she did not need to accommodate passengers in makeshift dormitories. She left Rotterdam on September 22 carrying 1,260 passengers, most of whom were US citizens. After calling at Boulogne and Southampton she reached Hoboken on September 29 carrying 1,197 passengers, including British actress Merle Oberon and Polish pianist Jan Smeterlin. Also aboard was Chiang Kai-shek's adopted son Chiang Wei-kuo, who had been serving in the German Army.

== Bermuda service ==
Nieuw Amsterdam had made 17 round trips between Rotterdam and Hoboken. On September 27, 1939, NASM announced that she would be laid up indefinitely because of high wartime marine insurance rates. However, on October 3 the Parliament of Bermuda approved an agreement between the Bermuda Trade Development Board and NASM for her to serve the island, making weekly sailings from Hoboken each Saturday and Bermuda each Wednesday. The service was experimental, to run for four weeks.

She left Hoboken on her new run for the first time on October 21, and reached Hamilton, Bermuda the next day. However, she returned to Hoboken carrying only 83 passengers. On November 4 NASM announced that the experiment had not attracted enough bookings, and so her November 11 sailing from Hoboken to Hamilton would be her last.

== 1939–40 winter cruises ==
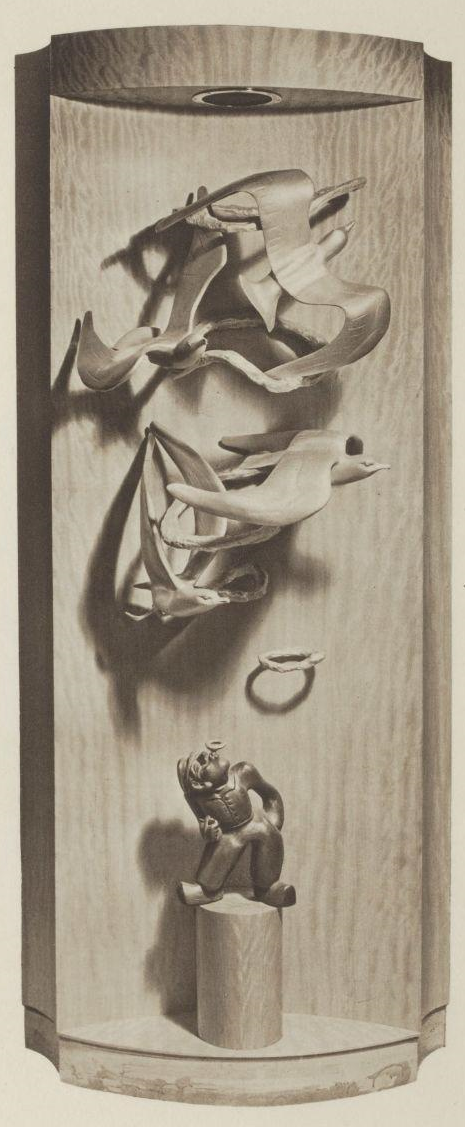
"Fantasieën van een rooker" ("Fantasies of a smoker") by Leen Bolle, on the tourist class vestbibule

After the Bermuda service failed, NASM announced that Nieuw Amsterdam would make five winter cruises from New York. Four would be to the Caribbean, and the fifth, starting on February 8, would repeat her circumnavigation of South America. NASM later revised the plan, abandoning the cruise around South America, and instead scheduled her to make a total of ten Caribbean cruises.

On December 23, 1939, she left Hoboken carrying 600 passengers on a cruise to Havana and Miami. Her decorations included a Christmas tree 25 feet (8 m) high in her Grand Hall. She got back to Hoboken on January 1, 1940. On January 3 she left Hoboken for Saint John, U.S. Virgin Islands, Curaçao, and La Guaira. She got back to Hoboken in January 11.

From January to March 1940 she made five cruises to Saint Thomas, U.S. Virgin Islands, Curaçao, and La Guaira, leaving Hoboken about every fortnight. Most of them also called at Puerto Cabello. On March 23 she left Hoboken for Port-au-Prince and Havana, returning to Hoboken on March 31.

Nieuw Amsterdam was then scheduled to make three more fortnightly cruises to St Thomas, Curaçao, La Guaira and Puerto Cabello. The first left Hoboken on April 6, and the second left Hoboken on April 20. The third left Hoboken on May 4, and reached La Guaira on May 9.

The next day, after she had left La Guaira, Nieuw Amsterdam received news that Germany had invaded the Netherlands. She cut short her cruise, and turned back to Hoboken without visiting Puerto Cabello or Havana. Eight Germans working in her steward's department were placed in protective custody as a precaution. They were five stewards, two cooks and one stewardess. They were to be handed over to the German Consulate General once the ship reached port. On May 14 she got back to Hoboken, and NASM stated that she would be laid up there for the duration of the war.

== Troop ship ==
By May 27, Germany had occupied the whole of the Netherlands. By June 7, Dutch government-in-exile and the UK government had formed a British-Netherlands shipping committee in London, and NASM announced that it would charter to the UK government all of its transatlantic ships except Nieuw Amsterdam, which remained laid up in Hoboken.

On September 7, 1940 Nieuw Amsterdam was dry docked for her annual inspection and overhaul. On September 11 she left New York, and from September 14 to October 11 she was in Halifax, Nova Scotia.

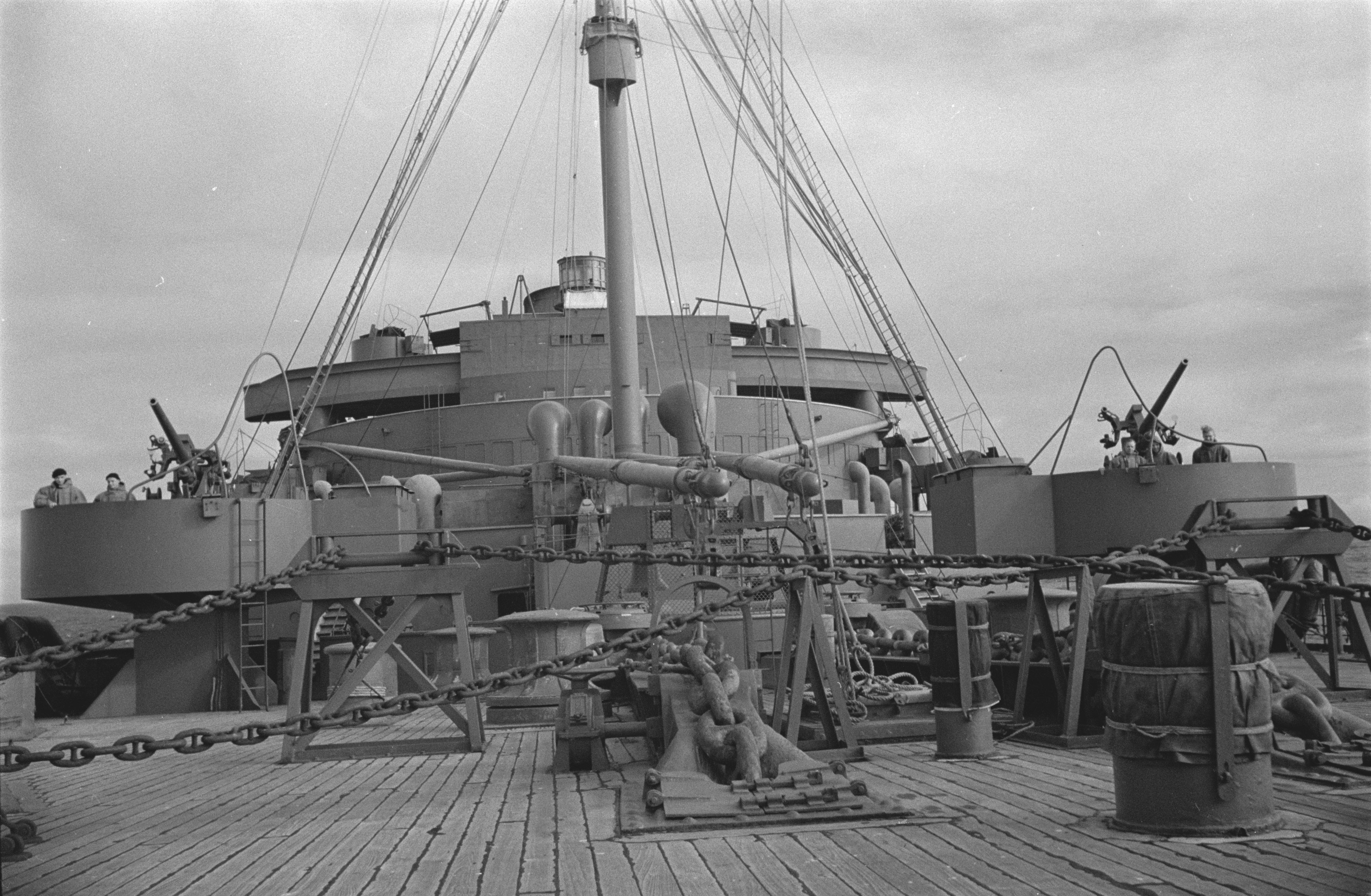
View aft from Nieuw Amsterdam's forecastle in 1944. A pair of anti-aircraft guns flanks her foremast, and in the background another pair flanks her bridge.

Nieuw Amsterdam was converted into a troopship. 2,000 tons of fittings were removed, and stored in San Francisco. Her passenger accommodation was converted into berths for 6,800 troops. Her portholes and windows were blacked out. She was defensively armed with 36 guns of various calibers.

=== In and around the Indian Ocean ===
Thanks to her speed, Nieuw Amsterdam usually sailed unescorted. On October 11, 1940, she left Halifax. She called at Cape Town, and was in Singapore from November 9 to December 24. She was in Sydney from January 2 to 23, 1941, Wellington from January 27 to February 1, and then returned to Sydney. She left Sydney carrying 3,842 troops as part of Convoy US 9, which was an unescorted convoy of fast troop ships. The other ships of the convoy were the Cunard Liners RMS Aquitania, Mauretania and Queen Mary. US 9 called at Fremantle, after which Queen Mary detached to take her 5,718 troops to Singapore. On February 22 Aquitania, Mauretania and Nieuw Amsterdam reached Bombay, carrying 11,114 troops between them.

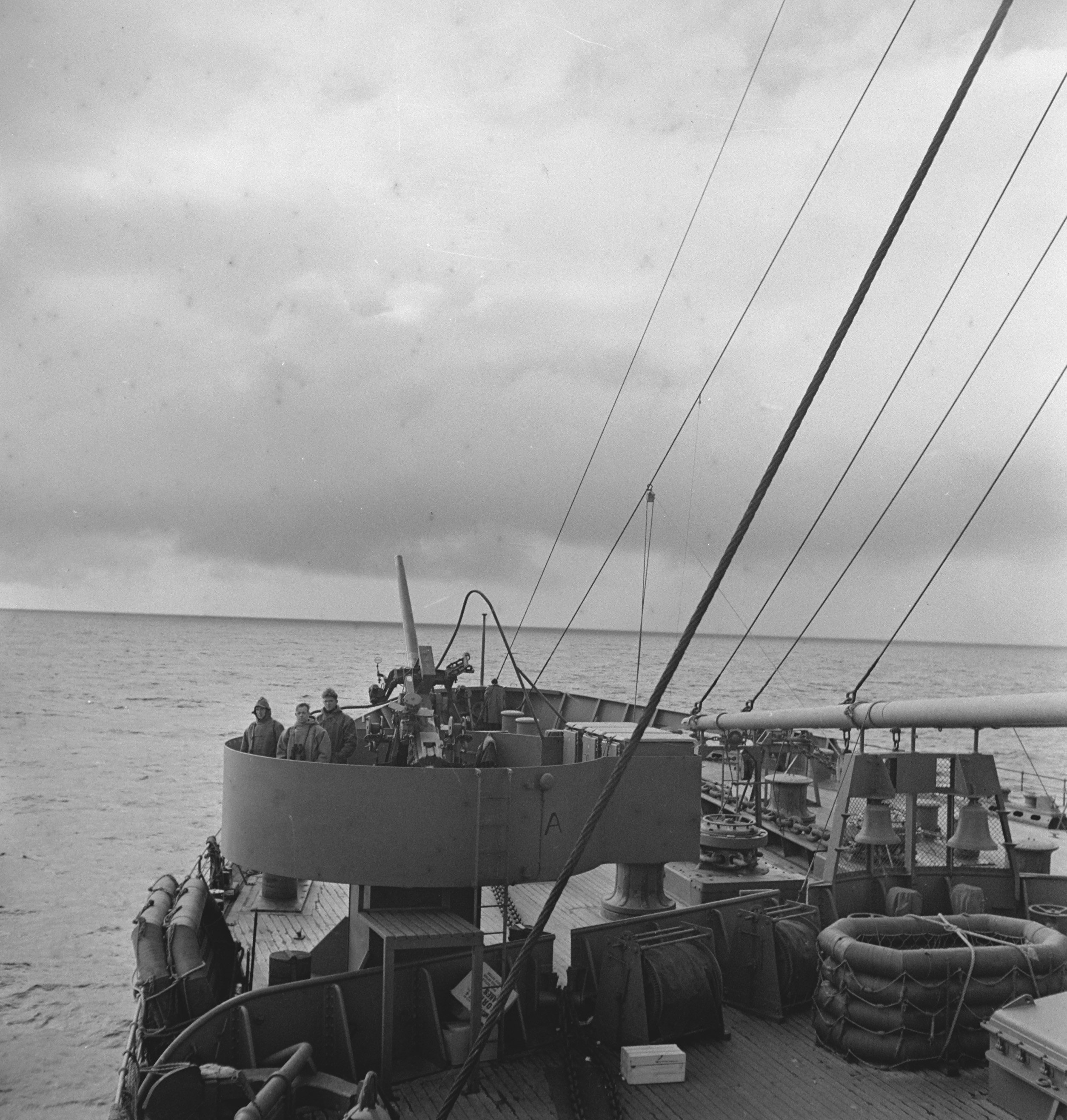
One of Nieuw Amsterdam's forward anti-aircraft guns

American President Lines' cargo liner President Taylor was leaving Bombay as the three troop ships arrived. On March 31 President Taylor reached New York, where her passengers told news reporters that they had seen Aquitania, Mauretania and Nieuw Amsterdam arriving in Bombay, and the Free French troop ship Île de France anchored in Singapore. The USA was still neutral, and The New York Times published a report including these details the next day.

In March 1941 Mauretania and Nieuw Amsterdam went via Colombo, Fremantle and Sydney to Wellington, where they arrived on March 31. Île de France joined them, they embarked troops, and the three liners crossed the Tasman Sea as Convoy US 10. RMS Queen Elizabeth and Queen Mary joined US 10 at Sydney, and Île de France detached at Fremantle. Nieuw Amsterdam was carrying 2,642 troops. US 10 reached Colombo on April 26. Nieuw Amsterdam continued to Singapore, where she was in port from April 24 to May 9.

From Singapore, Nieuw Amsterdam crossed the Indian Ocean via Bombay and Mombasa to Durban, where she arrived on July 7, 1942. She spent the next few months trooping mostly between Durban and Suez, with occasional variations to Bombay, Colombo, Cape Town, Port Elizabeth and Aden. She was in Diego-Suárez on August 8–9 during the Battle of Madagascar, and again on December 1–3 after Vichy French forces had surrendered.

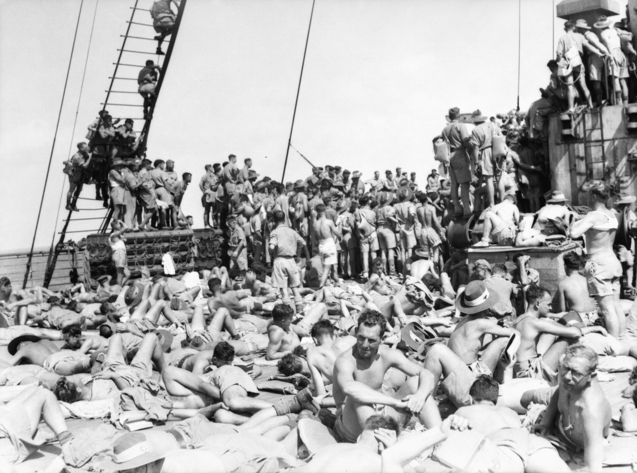
Australian troops aboard Nieuw Amsterdam in February 1943 during Operation Pamphlet

On February 3, 1943, Nieuw Amsterdam left Massawa in Eritrea as part of Operation Pamphlet to repatriate the 9th Australian Division. She called at Addu on February 10, reached Fremantle on February 18, and Melbourne on February 27.

Nieuw Amsterdam spent the next few months trooping between New Zealand, California, Australia, Ceylon, the Middle East and South Africa. She was in San Francisco from March 22 to May 3, from October 16 to November 1, and December 7–15, 1943.

=== Mostly in the North Atlantic ===
Her duties changed in February 1944. She was in Durban from February 10 to 20, called at Cape Town on February 22, and then went via Freetown in Sierra Leone to the Firth of Clyde in Scotland.

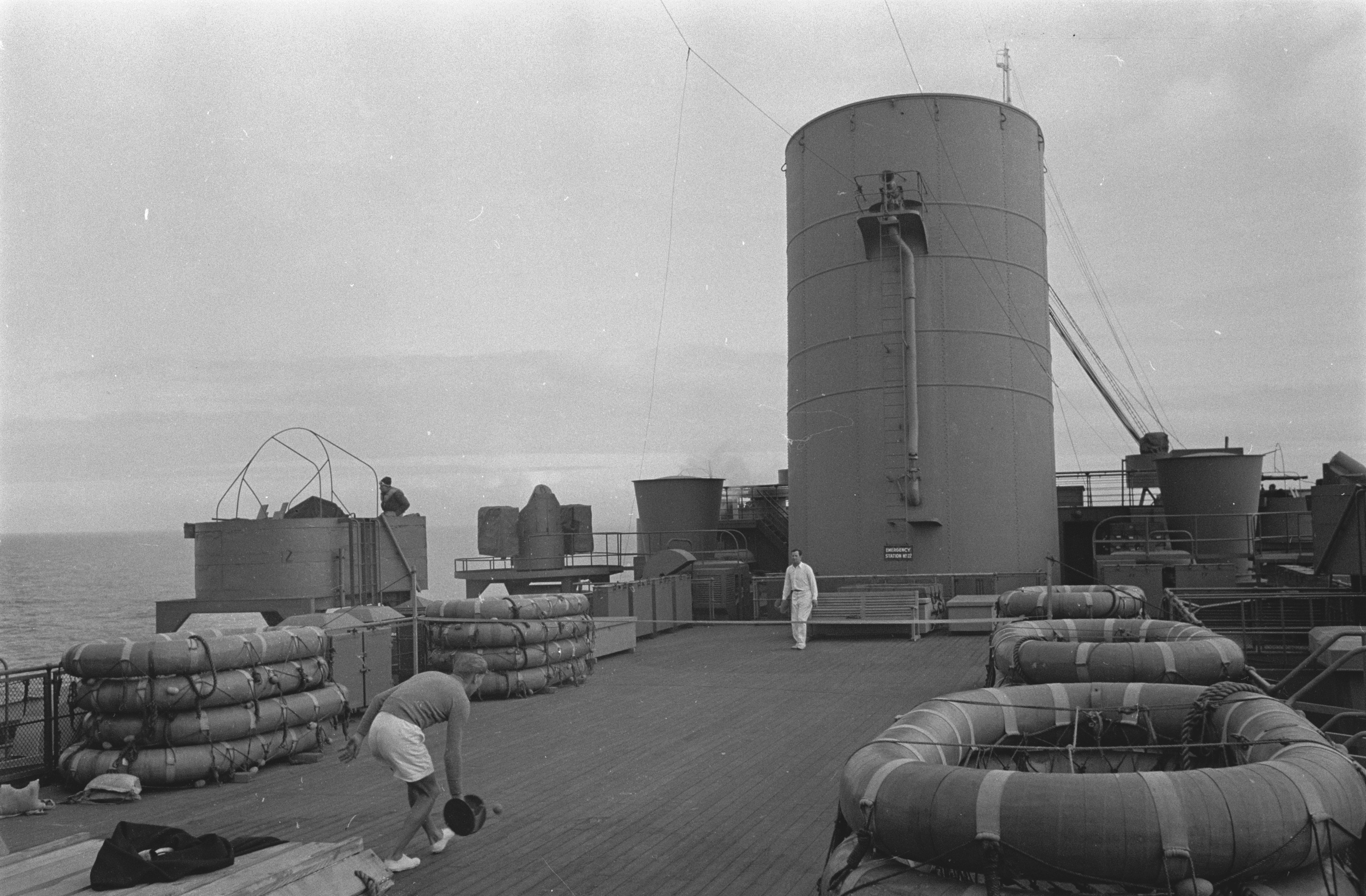
Playing tennis on deck in May 1944, flanked by Carley floats

Nieuw Amsterdam spent the next few months of 1944 trooping across the North Atlantic, usually between Halifax and the Clyde. She was in New York on April 13–18, and from May 7 to June 3. She made one voyage via Freetown to Cape Town, where she was in port on August 22–27. She then resumed North Atlantic crossings between the Clyde and either New York or Halifax, with one visit to Boston from October 25 to November 11. On March 4–8 she was in Liverpool.

Her duties changed again in April 1945. She left the Clyde on April 22, andwent via Gibraltar, the Mediterranean and the Suez Canal to Australia, where she was in Fremantle on May 16–18 and Sydney from May 23 to June 2. She then went via Durban, Cape Town and Freetown to Liverpool, where she was in port on July 6–18. She then crossed the Atlantic via Halifax to New York, where she spent a month in port from July 26 to August 24.

From New York, Nieuw Amsterdam crossed to Southampton, from where she made two round trips to Halifax in September and October 1945. She left Southampton on October 26, went via the Suez Canal and Trincomalee in Ceylon, and Penang and Port Swettenham in Malaya, and reached Singapore on November 22, where she landed 5,000 Dutch troops and civilians on their way back to the Dutch East Indies.

On December 8 she left Singapore, carrying 3,800 Dutch citizens, including 1,200 children, to be repatriated to the Netherlands. The children were very weak after being held in Japanese internment camps. Measles broke out aboard ship, and many of the children died. Girls aged 17 and 18 volunteered as nurses, but they became infected and died. The dead were buried at sea, and the funerals were held silently, at night, in an attempt to avoid causing panic. The ship went via Colombo and the Suez Canal to Southampton, where she arrived on January 1, 1946.

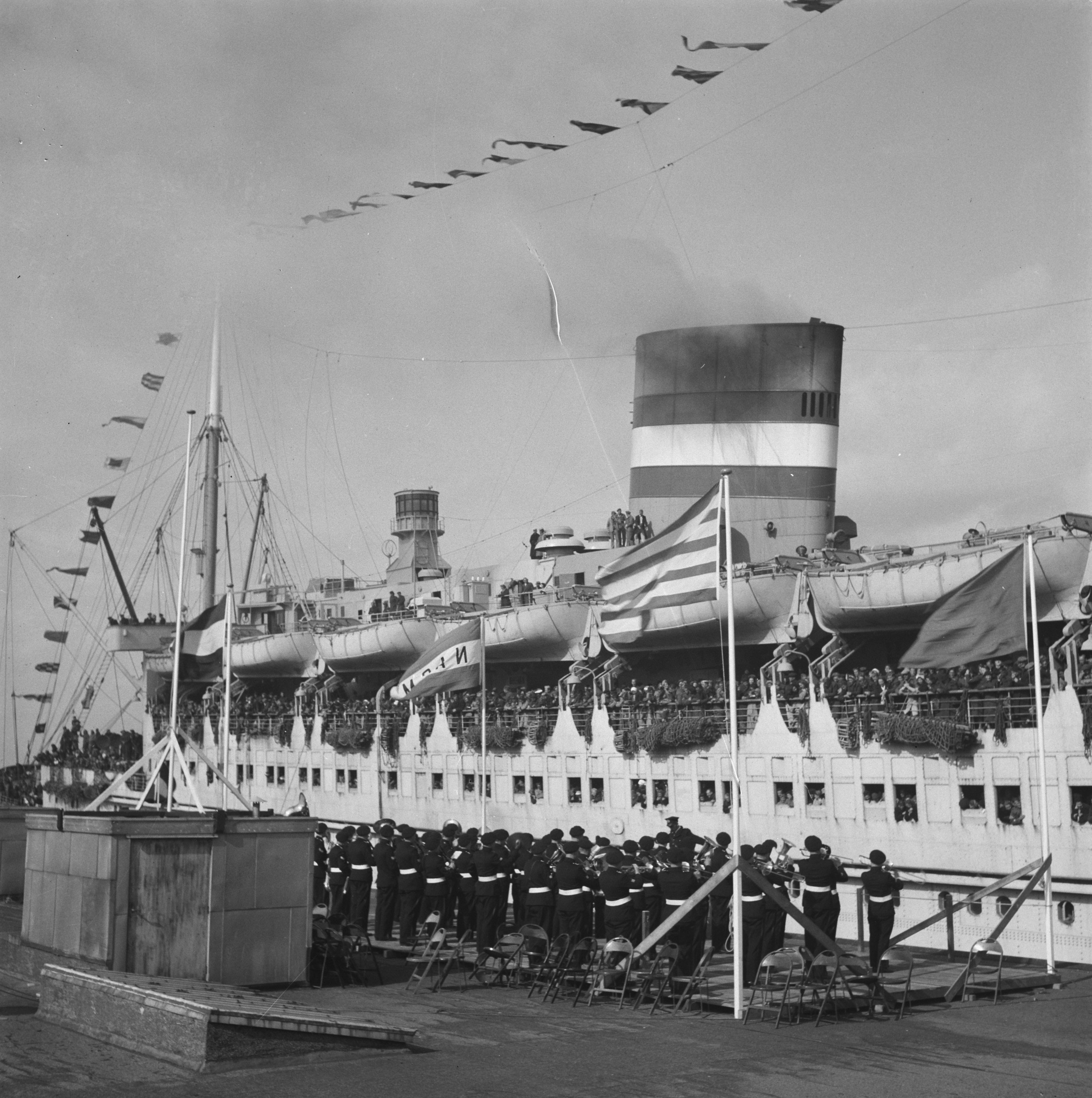
A band played on the quayside as Nieuw Amsterdam returned to Rotterdam on April 11, 1946

Nieuw Amsterdam was a troop ship for 73 months, in which time she sailed 530,452 nautical miles (982,397 km), including 17 round trips across the North Atlantic and back, and carried 378,361 people. She was returned to her owners, and arrived back in Rotterdam on April 11, 1946.

Also by 1946, radar had been added to her navigation equipment.

== 1947 refit ==
It cost more to refit Nieuw Amsterdam than it had to build her a decade earlier. One estimate was that she cost the equivalent of US$ 9 million to build before the war, and US$12 million to refit her afterward. NASM took the opportunity to redesign her interior, but also brought back many of the original artists to restore her.

It took 15 weeks to remove her wartime fittings such as gun mountings, alarm systems, hammocks and additional galleys. All of the ship's steelwork was scaled and preserved and all piping cleaned. The whole ship was re-wired. The wood paneling in her public spaces had been scratched and mutilated during troop service, so it was sanded down to half its thickness and relacquered. Thousands of initials, which troops had carved into her handrails, were polished out. All ceilings and floors were replaced. All the rubber flooring was renewed, as were nearly all of the carpets. Some of her portholes and windows had cracked in the tropics, so 12,000 square feet (1,100 m^{2}) of glass was replaced. All of the ship's 374 bathrooms were rebuilt. Every cabin's closets and fixtures were replaced.

Her stored furniture and decorations were shipped from San Francisco to the Netherlands. Most were in poor condition after six years in storage. A quarter had to be replaced. About 3,000 chairs and 500 tables were returned to their original makers for reupholstering and refinishing. Replacement materials and fabrics that were used included items that had been hidden from the Nazis during the German occupation. Many smaller parts, such as hinges and clamps, were made by hand, as the machinery to make them had been stolen or destroyed by the enemy.

Nieuw Amsterdam's keel "butts" were streamlined, which was intended to increase her speed. Her tonnages were revised to 36,667 GRT and 21,744 NRT. The refit took 18 months, slowed by post-war shortages of money, materials, and craftsmen. Items costing more than $500,000 were obtained from the USA because of shortages in Europe.

== Early post-war years ==
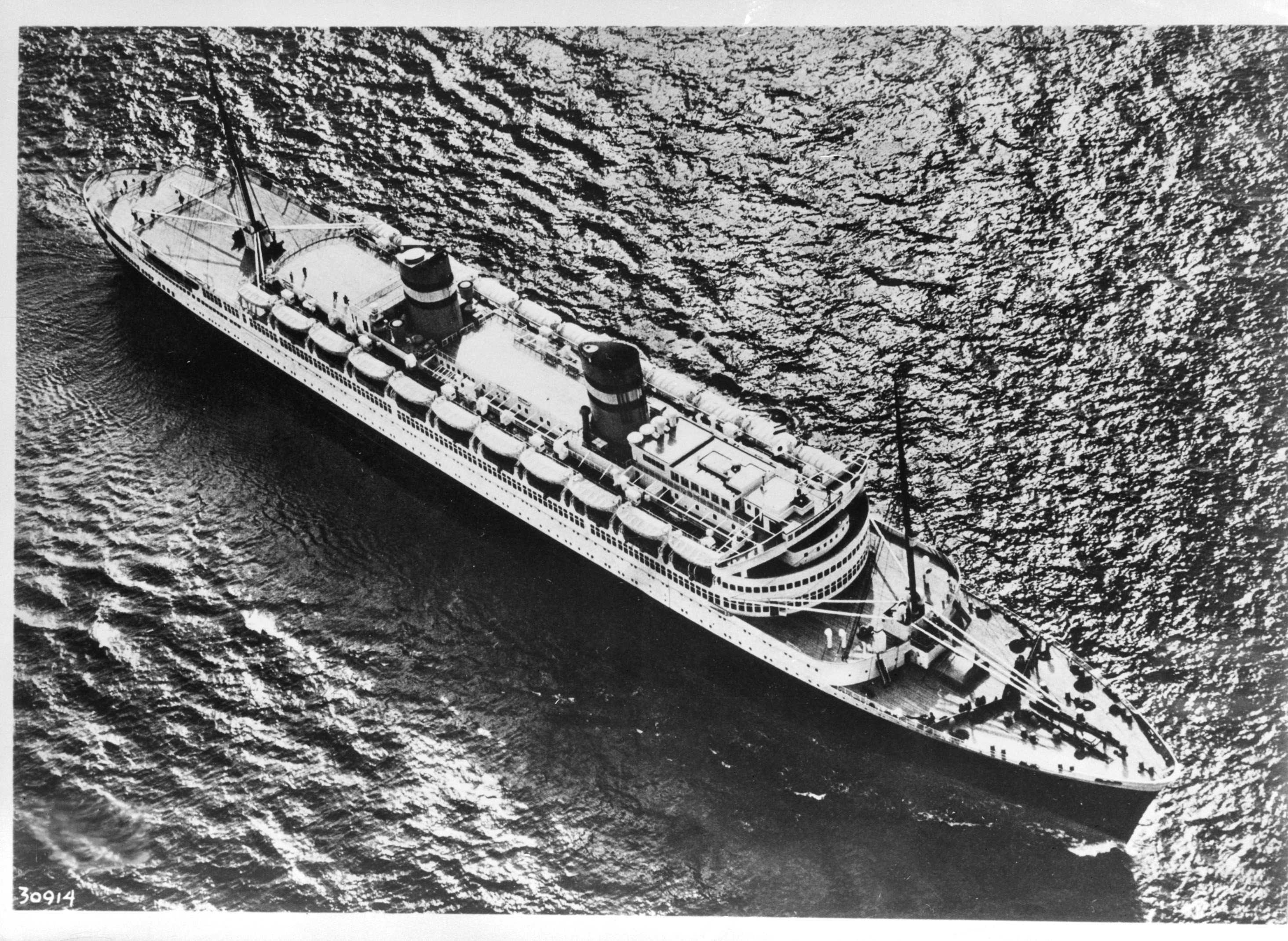
Aerial photograph of Nieuw Amsterdam

On October 29, 1947 Nieuw Amsterdam left Rotterdam for Hoboken for the first time in seven years. She called at Southampton, and on November 6 entered the Hudson River to a traditional welcome of fireboats making a display with jets of water, and ships and boats giving three blasts on their whistles. At Hoboken she landed 1,256 passengers. On November 10 she left Hoboken for Rotterdam, carrying 604 passengers, and 44,919 pounds (20,375 kg) of charity relief supplies for the Netherlands.

On December 4, 1947 Nieuw Amsterdam left Hoboken on a cruise to the Caribbean: her first cruise since May 1940.

Until 1940, NASM transatlantic ships had served Boulogne. After the war this did not resume, because the port of Boulogne was not yet in a condition to resume handling large ocean liners. Instead, from February 3, 1948, Nieuw Amsterdam started calling at Le Havre.

In 1948 some of her westbound crossings were almost fully-booked. The number of passengers she landed at Hoboken from Europe was 1,190 on August 10, 1,244 on November 3, and 1,201 on December 19. Among them were the writer Aldous Huxley on November 3, and Ralph Bunche on December 19, returning from his work assisting the United Nations Special Committee on Palestine. Notable passengers sailing east on Nieuw Amsterdam that year included the exiled royal family of Yugoslavia: King Peter II, Queen Alexandra, and their young son Crown Prince Alexander, who left Hoboken for France and Britain on July 24.

Nieuw Amsterdam was scheduled to make five cruises in the 1948–49 season. The first carried 800 passengers. It left Hoboken on December 21, called at San Juan, La Guaira and Kingston, Jamaica, and got back to Hoboken on January 3, 1949. Her third cruise was an 18-day voyage that added Cap-Haïtien and Ciudad Trujillo to her more usual ports of call. It left Hoboken on January 21, carrying 650 passengers. Two similar cruises followed. On March 24, 1949, she resumed her transatlantic service, leaving Hoboken with 1,120 passengers for Europe.

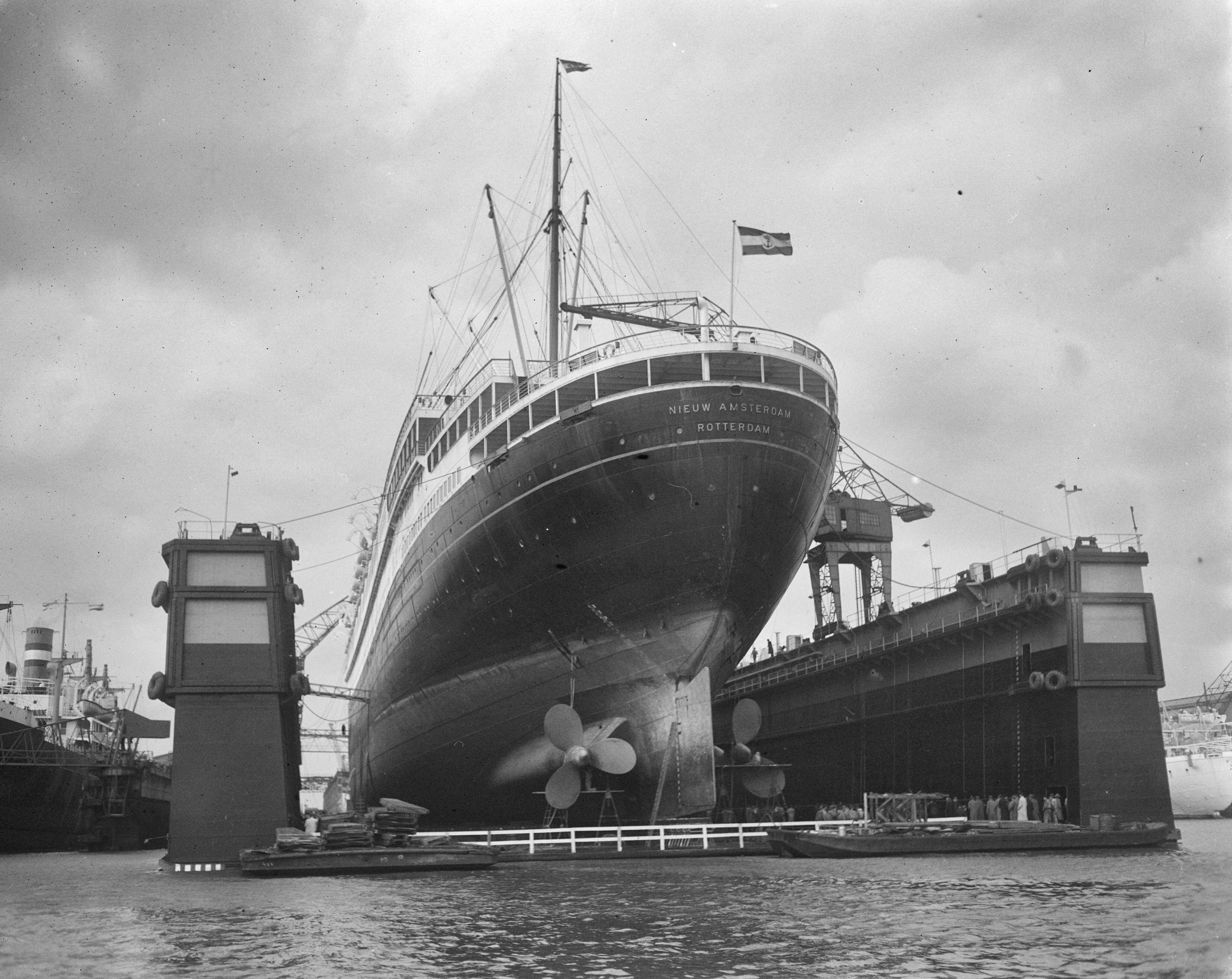
Nieuw Amsterdam in Wilton-Fijenoord's floating dry dock in April 1950, flying the ensign of the Royal Netherlands Navy Reserve

The Master of NASM's flagship was customarily commodore of the company's fleet. Nieuw Amsterdam was the flagship from her introduction in 1938 until the introduction of the new Rotterdam in 1959. The flagship was entitled to a special version of the NASM's green and white house flag, which had an orange star in one corner. In June 1949 NASM appointed a new Master to Nieuw Amsterdam, Cornelis HP Coster, who was also a commandeur in the Royal Netherlands Navy Reserve. This entitled Nieuw Amsterdam to fly the ensign of the Dutch naval reserve while he was in command. Coster retired in October 1950.

In 1949 the ship continued to be almost fully-booked on some crossings. The number of passengers she landed at Hoboken from Europe was 997 on June 28, 1,230 on September 4, 1,201 on October 19, and 1,038 on December 14, including the composer Samuel Barber. On August 16 she left Hoboken for Europe carrying 1,025 passengers, including the sculptor Jacob Epstein, pollster George Gallup, and actor Walter Pidgeon.

For the 1949–50 cruise season, Nieuw Amsterdam was to make a series of Caribbean voyages, and then end the season with a 50-day circumnavigation of South America. Her first Caribbean cruise left Hoboken on the night of December 17–18, 1949, carrying 600 passengers. New ports of call included Fort-de-France, and Cartagena, Colombia. On January 6, 1950, she left Hoboken on a 13-day Caribbean cruise carrying only 400 passengers. However, on January 21 she began her next 13-day cruise with 675 passengers.

Her voyage around South America began from Hoboken on February 8. 607 passengers paid a total of US$2.7 million in fares. Her route was via Havana to the Panama Canal, then anti-clockwise around the continent: down the Pacific coast of South America, up the Atlantic coast, and into the Caribbean to visit Trinidad, Curaçao and Jamaica before returning. She got back to Hoboken on March 29. On March 31 she resumed her transatlantic service, leaving Hoboken for Rotterdam. NASM claimed that demand for transatlantic travel in 1950 was high, with many sailings scheduled for later in the year already fully-booked by February.

On December 20, 1950, the ship left Hoboken on her first Caribbean cruise of the 1950–51 season. She returned on January 1, 1951. That winter, using both Nieuw Amsterdam and a smaller liner, Veendam, NASM ran seven cruises, which carried a total of about 4,000 passengers.

== Reduction gear failure ==
At the end of October 1951, Nieuw Amsterdam was taken out of service for three months for her five-year survey and an overhaul. At the end of January, 1952 she left Rotterdam, on February 6 she arrived in Hoboken, and on February 9 she left carrying 750 passengers on a seven-day cruise to Havana and Nassau, Bahamas. One of her subsequent cruises started from Hoboken on March 18 and was due back on the morning of April 1. However, when she was in harbor in Kingston, Jamaica, the reduction gearing to her starboard propeller shaft broke. This reduced her speed to 13 knots (24 km/h) and impaired her maneuverability. Her Master canceled a call she was scheduled to make at Havana, she got back to Hoboken half a day late, and NASM gave her 750 passengers an eight percent refund on their fares.

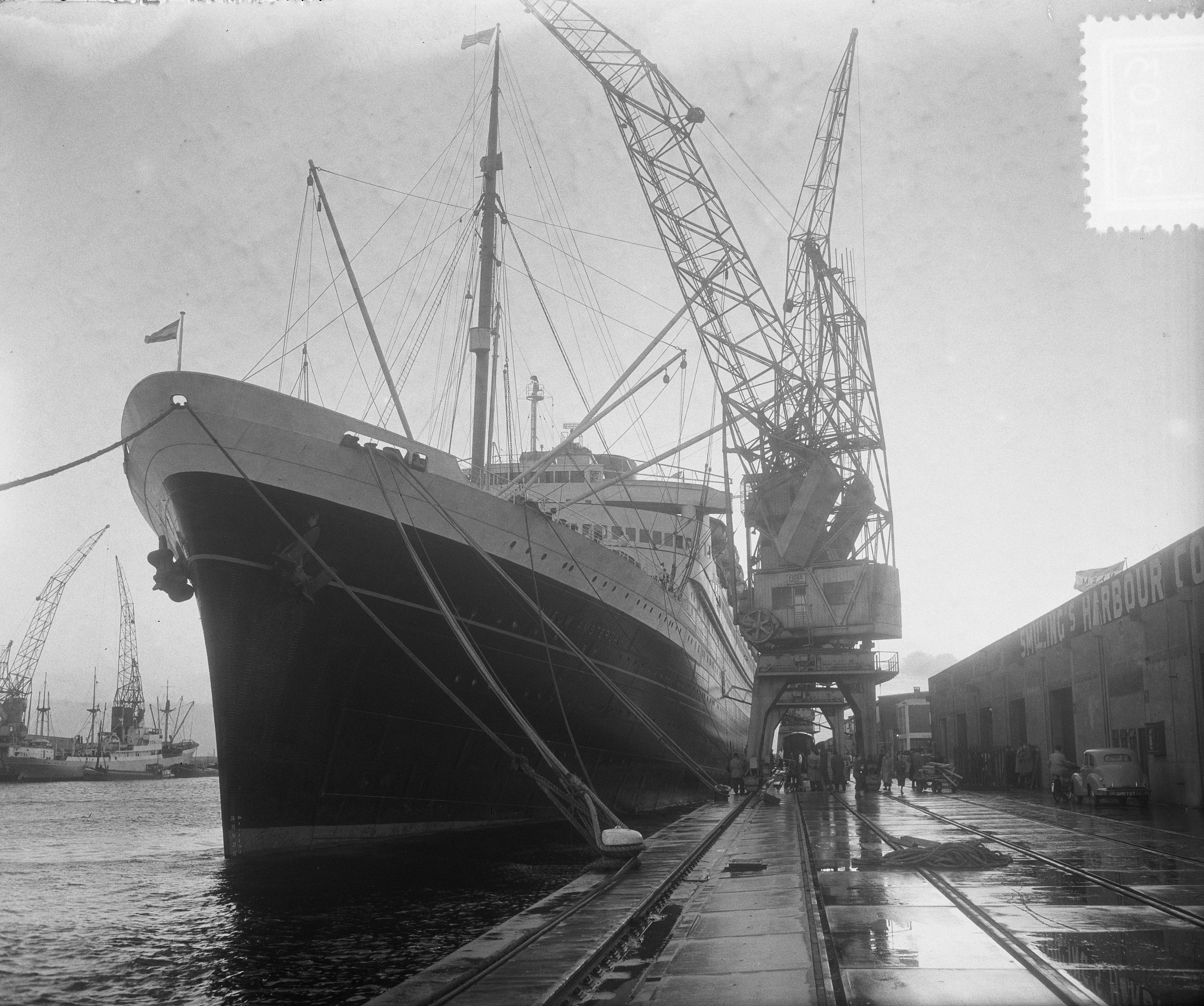
Nieuw Amsterdam in Amsterdam in November 1952

Nieuw Amsterdam was repaired and returned to service. On June 6 she left Hoboken on a fully-booked sailing with 1,213 passengers for Europe. On July 20 she reached Hoboken with 1,082 passengers from Europe. On November 6 the Panamanian Liberty ship Faustus ran aground, blocking the Nieuwe Waterweg into Rotterdam. By November 8 she was still aground, so Nieuw Amsterdam was diverted to the Port of Amsterdam. It was the first time she had ever visited the port.

For 1953, Nieuw Amsterdam's schedule included a 36-day Rotary cruise to the western Mediterranean, starting from Hoboken on April 23. One of her eastbound transatlantic crossings was scheduled to make an additional intermediate call at Boston on August 18, to embark a pilgrimage to Ireland led by Archbishop Richard Cushing. Some of her transatlantic crossings were almost fully-booked. On November 13, 1953, she landed 1,145 passengers at Hoboken, including the Hungarian ballet-dancers István Rabovsky and Nora Kovach, who had defected via West Berlin that May.

On June 11, 1955 Nieuw Amsterdam diverted on an Atlantic crossing to meet the Greek cargo ship Marpessa, which had radioed for help for an injured crewman. He was transferred to Nieuw Amsterdam's hospital, where surgeon from among the liner's passengers operated on him, assisted by the ship's physician.

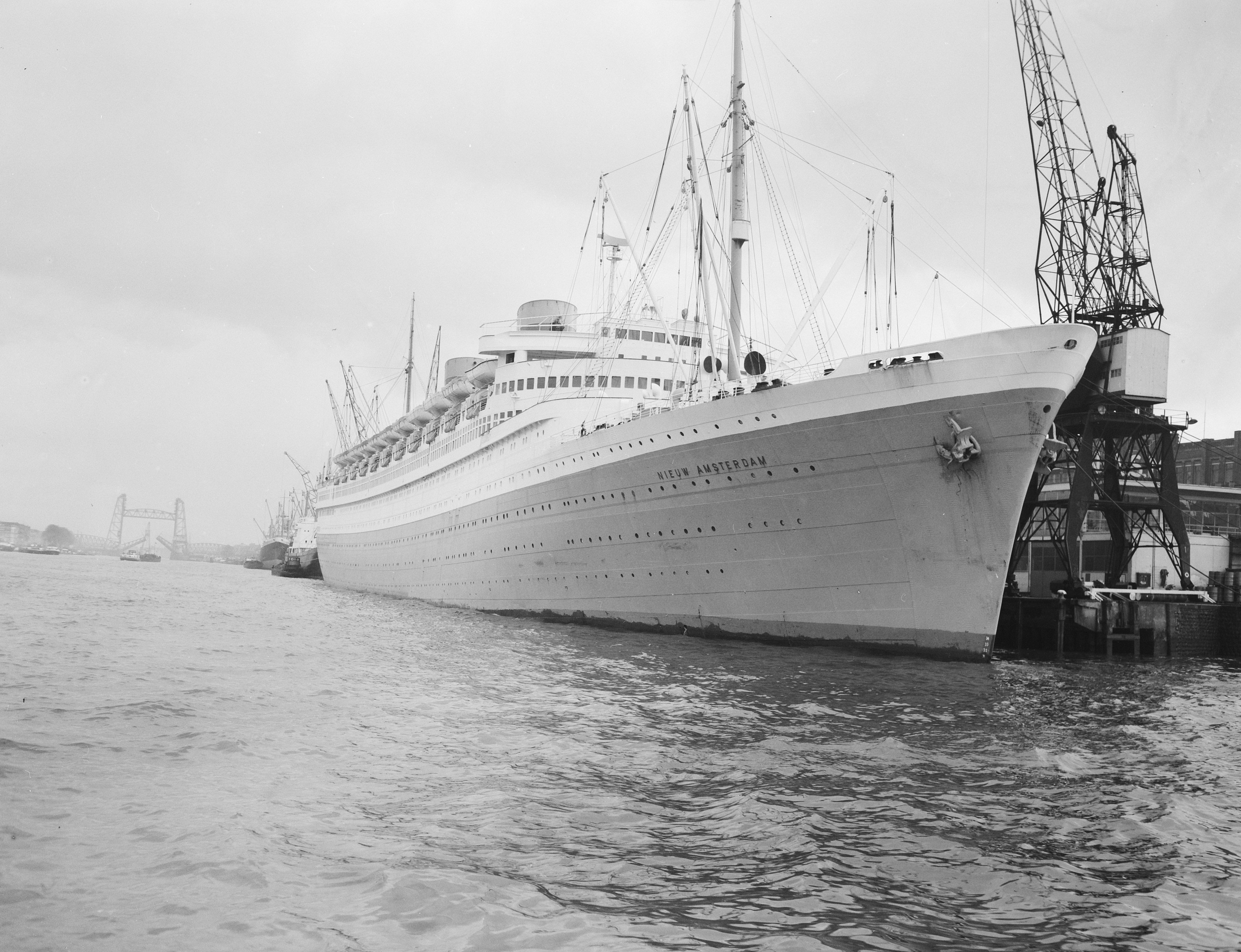
Nieuw Amsterdam in Rotterdam in 1957, with her hull painted dove-gray

For the 1956–57 season, NASM at first planned for Nieuw Amsterdam to make two Caribbean cruises, and then a 60-day cruise to the Canary Islands and the Mediterranean, including Istanbul and Venice. However, the company later replaced the Mediterranean cruise with three more Caribbean ones. She was to spend the first part of the winter undergoing a three-month overhaul, which was to include fitting stabilizers to her hull and installing air conditioning throughout her passenger accommodation. At the same time, her hull was repainted from NASM's traditional black to a new dove-gray.

She returned to service in January 1957, called at Halifax on the first westbound crossing after her overhaul, and arrived at Hoboken on January 29. She was to start her first cruise from Hoboken on February 19, 1957, and the fifth and final one on April 30.

== Fire in Rotterdam ==
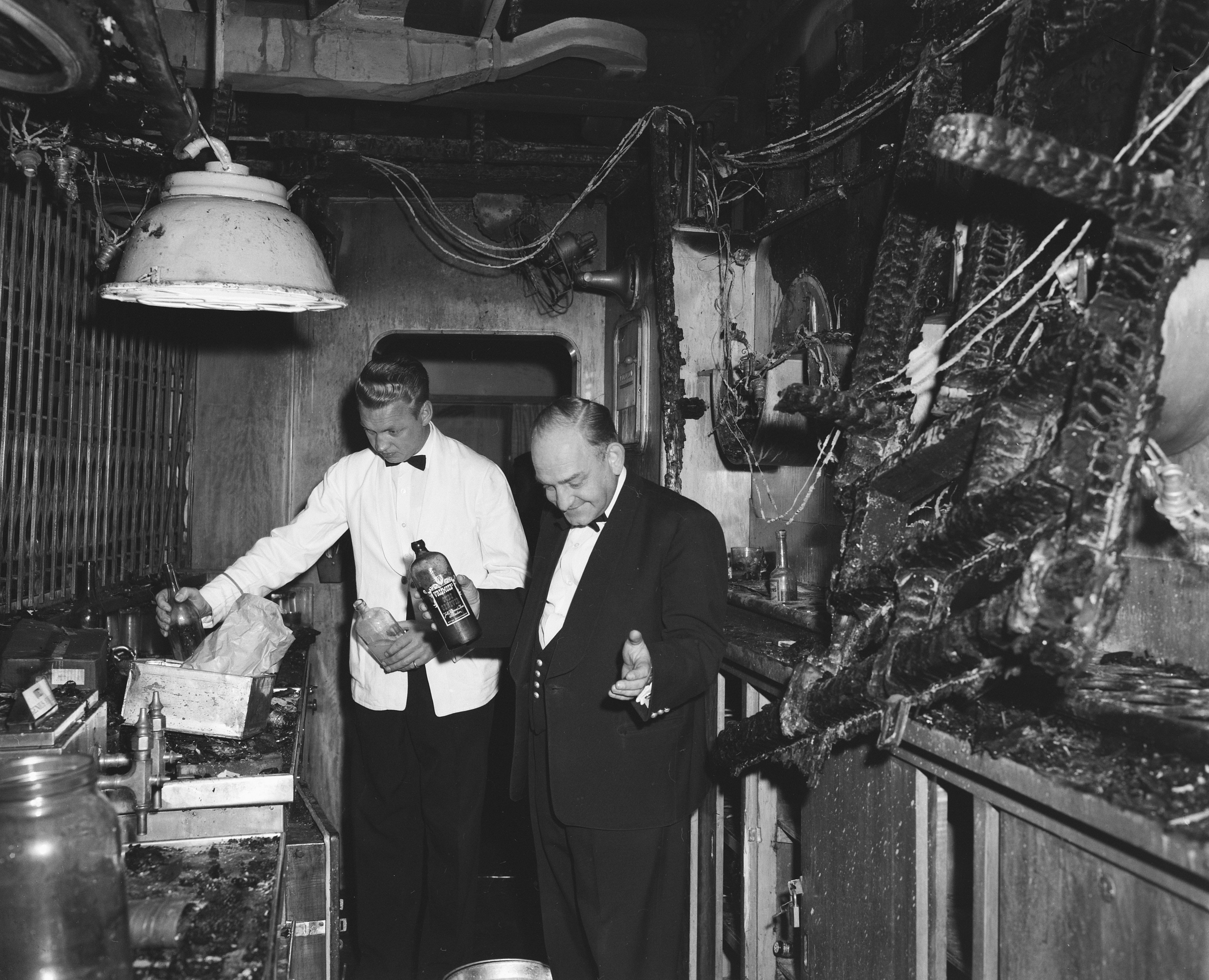
Members of the steward's department inspecting fire damage, October 22, 1957

In Rotterdam on October 21, 1957, fire damaged part of Nieuw Amsterdam near her stern. The fire was put out, and she was withdrawn from service until December 9. She was repaired, and on December 20 left Hoboken with 750 passengers for a 16-day Caribbean cruise. She was scheduled to continue cruising until the end of March 1958. On January 2, 1958, the ship was in Havana in a gale and heavy rain. A barge moored to her was torn from its moorings. Havana harbor police rescued two passengers, but a seaman was reported missing.

On a westbound transatlantic crossing on December 12, a freak wave broke over the ship and broke one of the windows of her bridge. A splinter of glass gave her Master, Commodore Coenraad Bouman, an eye injury. He was landed at Cobh for treatment. Nieuw Amsterdam started her 1958–59 cruises on December 19 with a different Master. Commodore Bouman resumed to duty on January 7, 1959.

For the 1959–60 season, Nieuw Amsterdam was scheduled to start earlier than usual. NASM scheduled her to make a fall cruise to Bermuda, leaving Hoboken on September 25, spending three days in port in Hamilton, and getting back on October 1. Also in September 1959, the new Rotterdam was completed and entered service. She which was slightly larger than Nieuw Amsterdam, and became the NASM flagship.

== 1961 refit ==
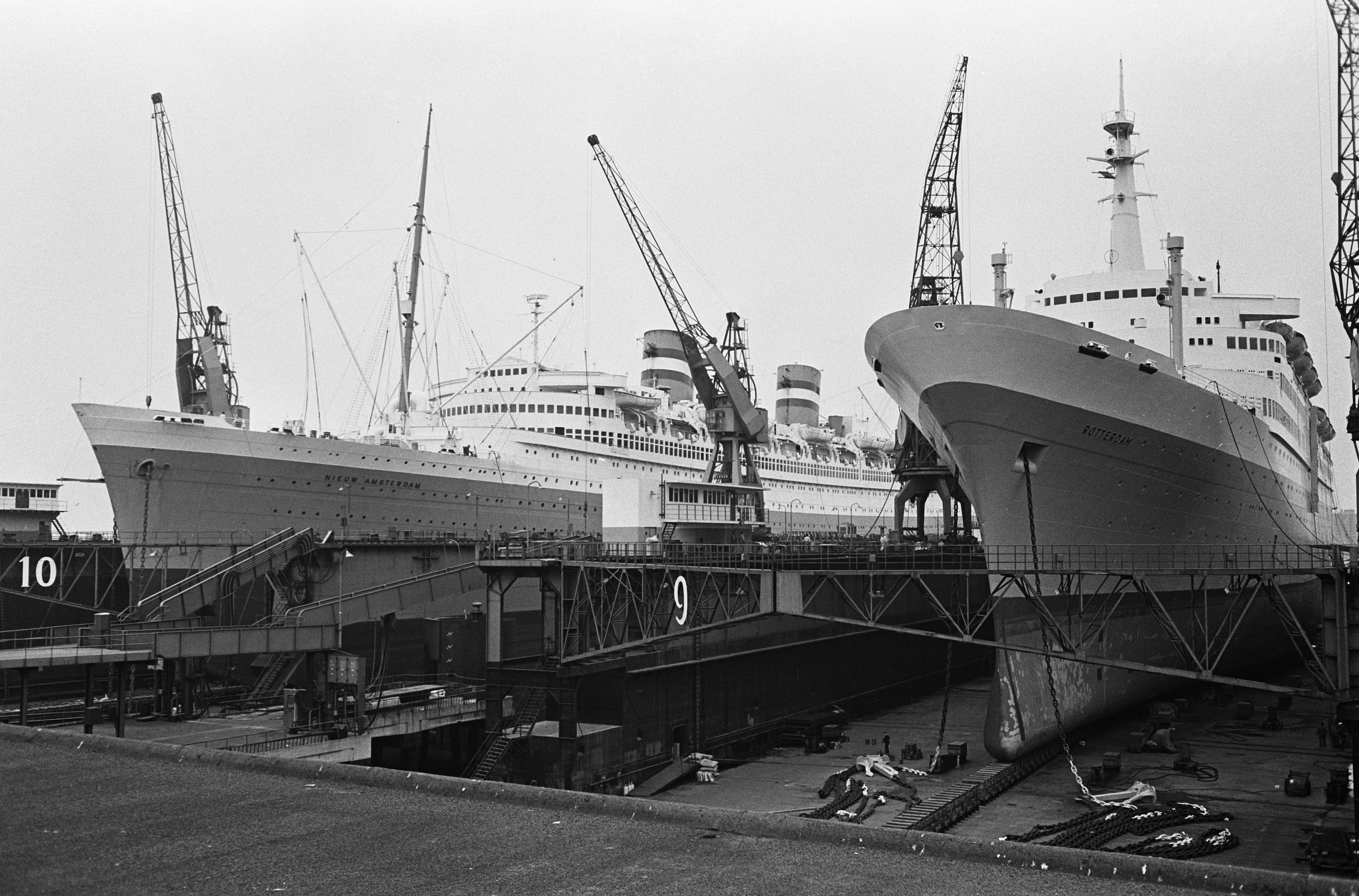
Nieuw Amsterdam and Rotterdam dry docked side by side in Rotterdam in 1963

In October 1961 Nieuw Amsterdam was withdrawn from service to be extensively refitted. Her accommodation was reduced to two classes: first class and tourist class. Her cabins and public rooms were given new carpets, mirrors, and furniture. Lighting was improved throughout the ship. An additional children's playroom, shopping arcade, library, music room, writing room, and CinemaScope movie theater were added. The refit took four months, and cost the equivalent of more than US$5 million.

Much of her passenger accommodation was made flexible, to meet the differing requirements of cruising and transatlantic service. Her first class accommodation could be varied from 301 to 690 berths, and her tourist accommodation could be varied from 583 to 972 berths. For cruising, she would offer up to 750 first class berths. Her machinery and electrical equipment were overhauled. The overhaul increased her tonnage from 36,667 GRT to 36,982 GRT. After her overhaul the ship arrived in Hoboken on January 26, 1962 to begin the first of four Caribbean cruises for that season.

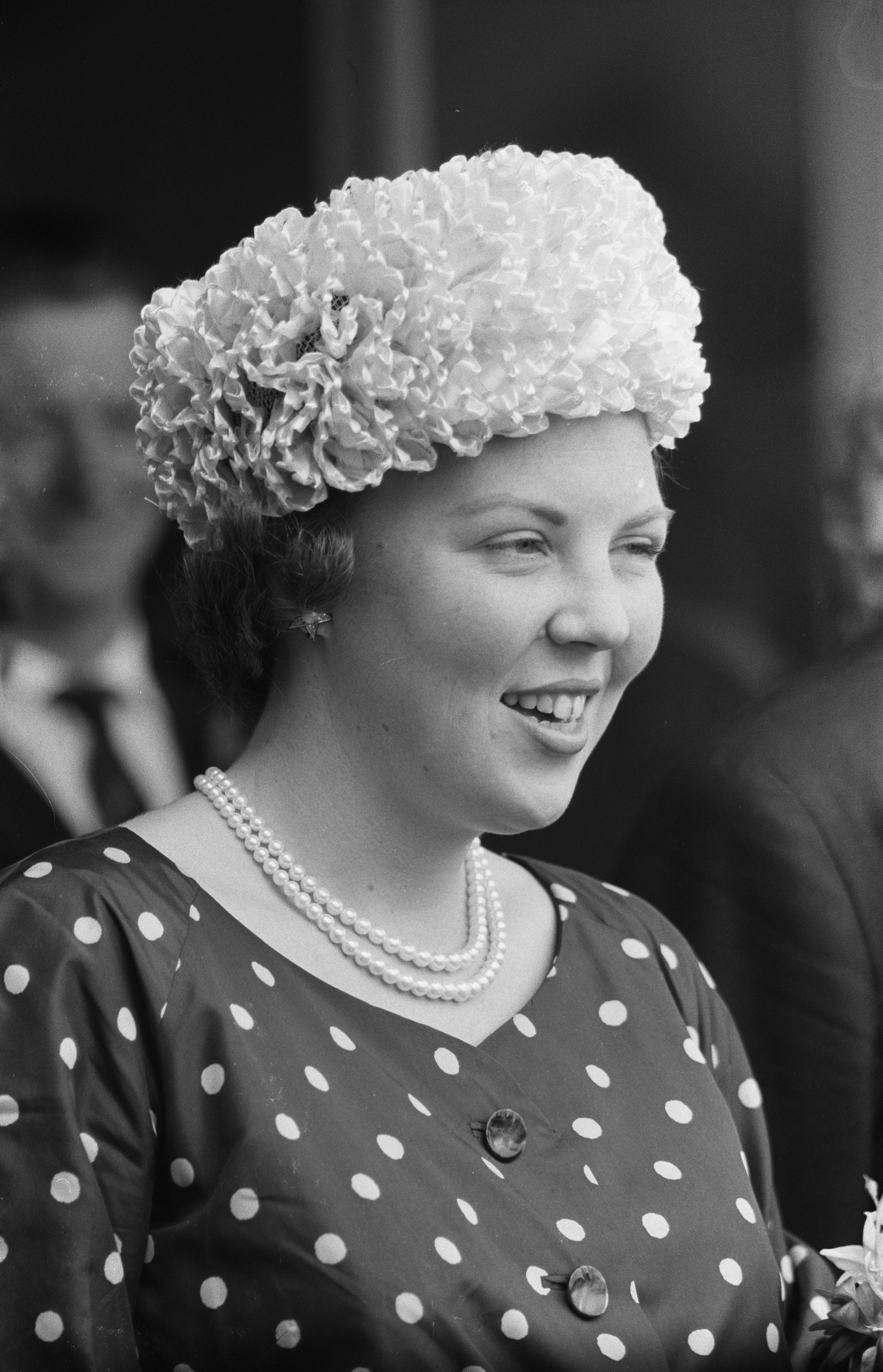
Crown Princess Beatrix of the Netherlands in 1963

After her refit, NASM increased the number of months Nieuw Amsterdam spent cruising, and reduced the number that she spent in transatlantic service. By late October 1962 she was on a 12-day fall cruise, and NASM planned a season of continuous cruises from December 1962 to June 1963. In New York on April 22, 1963, Crown Princess Beatrix of the Netherlands came aboard the ship for a private lunch during her World tour. The ship continued to be nearly fully-booked for some of her transatlantic crossings. On August 21, 1963, she landed 1,163 passengers from Europe at Hoboken.

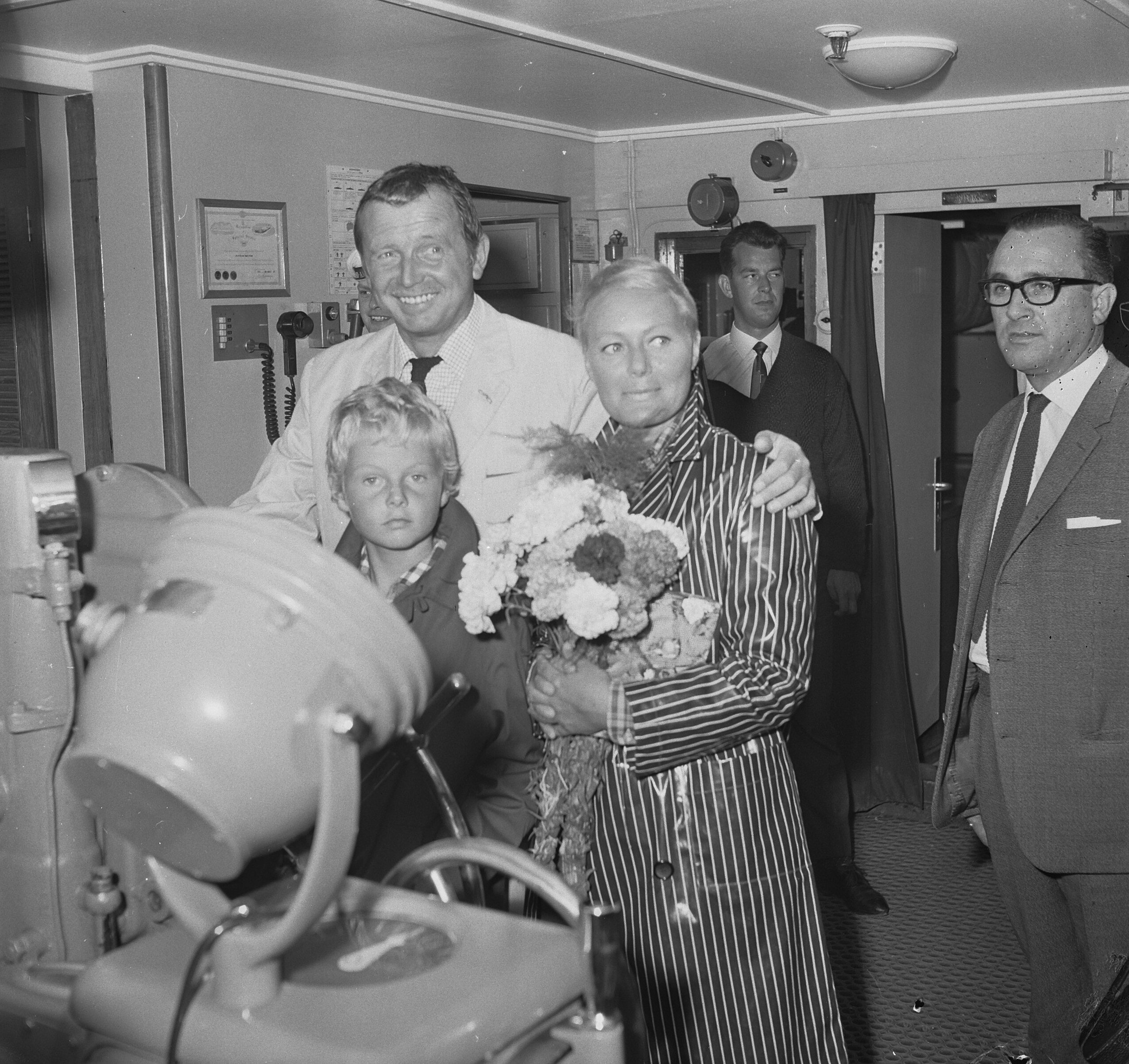
Dutch entertainer Toon Hermans and his family visiting Nieuw Amsterdam's bridge in August 1965

In February 1967 NASM installed a Golfomat electronic golf simulator aboard the ship, and engaged Doug Ford to demonstrate it in port. The machine simulated the golf course of the Congressional Country Club in Maryland. Also in 1967, NASM rescheduled Nieuw Amsterdam's annual overhaul to start at the beginning of April instead of the end, for reasons of economy. The company canceled a 12-day Caribbean cruise, six-day Bermuda cruise and one eastbound transatlantic crossing that she the ship been scheduled to make. She was scheduled to return to service on May 6, leaving Rotterdam on a 28-day Mediterranean cruise.

== Replacement boilers ==
In July 1967 NASM canceled Nieuw Amsterdam's sailings from then until September because of a boiler fault. She had been scheduled to leave Rotterdam westbound on July 18, August 8, and August 29, from Hoboken eastbound on July 28, August 18, and September 8, and to leave Rotterdam on September 18 for a 22-day African cruise. On August 16 she entered the Wilton-Fijenoord shipyard in Schiedam. Five of her six Schelde-Yarrow boilers were replaced, but one was left as ballast. Her replacement boilers were surplus from the United States Navy. She left the dock on October 26, and made sea trials from November 30 to December 2. On December 12 she left Rotterdam, and on December 21 she reached Hoboken.

On May 18, 1968 Nieuw Amsterdam left Hoboken for an 18-day cruise. On May 22 she was scheduled to visit Bermuda, but NASM changed this to Nassau due to recent unrest in Bermuda, and the fact that there would be elections in Bermuda on May 22. Also in 1968, NASM announced that that fall she would be altered to comply with the 1960 International Convention for the Safety of Life at Sea. She was scheduled to return to Hoboken early that November to start a season of Caribbean cruises. On November 1 she left Rotterdam for Hoboken, but suffered a problem with one of her propeller shafts. She anchored off the Dutch coast for repairs, and reached Hoboken a day late, on November 10.

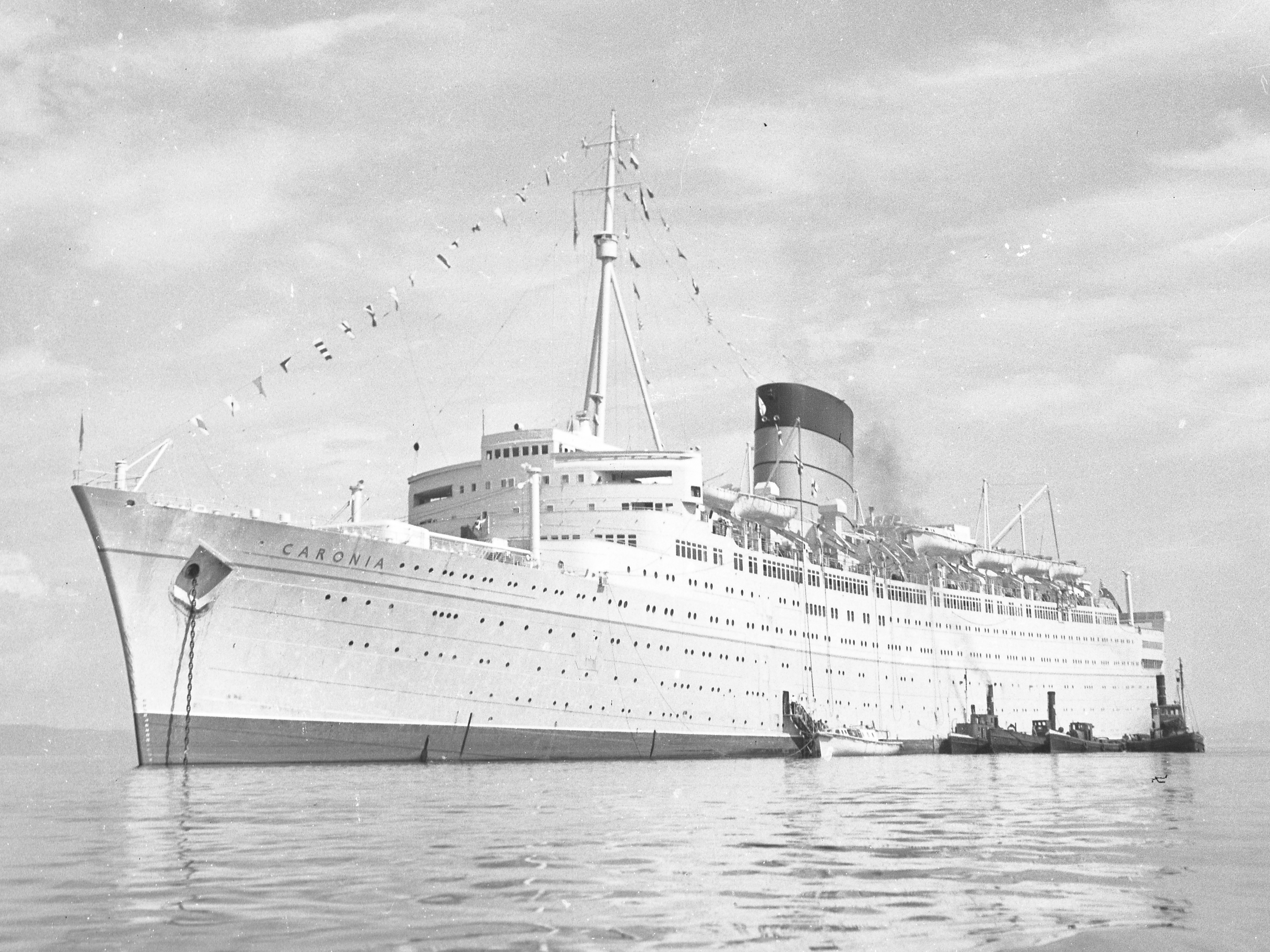
The cruise ship Caribia, formerly the Cunard Liner RMS Caronia

In December 1968, cruises by the Panamanian liner Caribia were cancelled, because the delivery of parts she needed for her machinery had been delayed. Her first cruise was due to leave New York on December 11. 200 of her 400 passengers accepted the offer of being transferred to a 10-day Caribbean cruise by Nieuw Amsterdam that was leaving Hoboken the same day.

== Port Everglades ==
In November 1969 NASM announced that Nieuw Amsterdam and Rotterdam would each start two Caribbean cruises from Port Everglades, Florida, instead of Hoboken. However, in 1970 both ships continued to operate some cruises from Hoboken. Nieuw Amsterdam's cruising season continued until at least the end of May 1970. She had a shorter transatlantic season that year. One westbound voyage left Rotterdam on August 26 and reached Hoboken on September 3. She then ran cruises from Hoboken to the Caribbean every two or three weeks for the rest of 1970 and into January and February 1971.

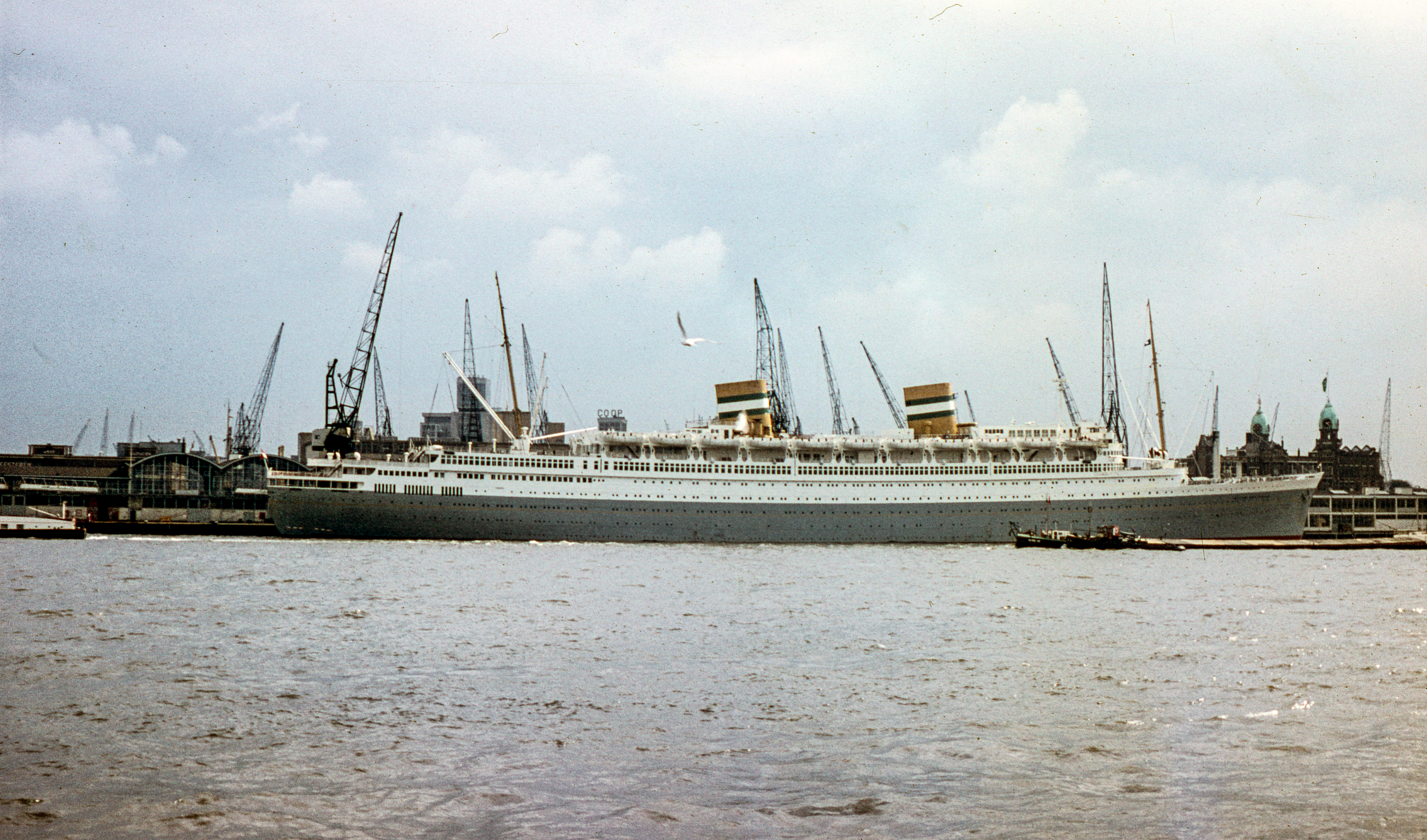
Nieuw Amsterdam in Rotterdam in 1969

On November 8, 1971 Nieuw Amsterdam left Rotterdam on her final transatlantic crossing to Hoboken. Thereafter she was entirely a cruise ship, mostly to the Caribbean. Her final cruise was from December 7 to 17, 1973. Thereafter she was anchored outside Port Everglades, Florida.

NASM sold the ship for scrap for 12 million guilders. On January 9, 1974, she left Port Everglades with a skeleton crew of 80 men. She bunkered at Curaçao, passed through the Panama Canal, and called at Honolulu. On March 2 she reached Kaohsiung, Taiwan. Nan Fung Steel Enterprise started her breaking on May 16, and completed it on October 5.

== Bibliography ==
- Guns, Nico (2015–2019). dsts Nieuw Amsterdam. Parts 1 to 7. Dutch language. gbooksinternational
- Britton, Andrew (2015). SS Nieuw Amsterdam. Classic Liners series. Stroud: The History Press. ISBN 978-0750961028.
- Freivogel, Zvonimir (2006). "Question 3/04: Dutch Steamer Nieuw Amsterdam". Warship International. XLIII (1): 34. ISSN 0043-0374.
- Haws, Duncan (1995). Holland America Line. Merchant Fleets series. Vol. 28. Uckfield: Travel Creatours Ltd Publications. ISBN 0946378258.
- Headquarters of the Commander in Chief, United States Fleet and Commander, Tenth Fleet (1945). History of Convoy and Routing. United States Naval Administration in World War II. Washington, DC: United States Department of the Navy – via Naval History and Heritage Command.
- Leighton, Richard M; Coakley, Robert W (1999). The War Department — Global Logistics And Strategy 1943–1945. United States Army In World War II. Vol. 2. Washington, DC: Center Of Military History, United States Army. LCCN 55060001.
- Lloyd's Register of Shipping (PDF). Vol. II.–Steamers and Motorships of 300 Tons Gross and Over. London: Lloyd's Register of Shipping. 1938 – via Southampton City Council.
- Lloyd's Register of Shipping (PDF). Vol. I.–Steamers and Motorships of 300 Tons. Trawlers, Tugs, Dredgers etc. Sailing Vessels. Shipowners etc. London: Lloyd's Register of Shipping. 1939 – via Southampton City Council.
- Lloyd's Register of Shipping. Vol. Steamers and Motorships of 300 Tons Gross and Over. London: Lloyd's Register of Shipping. 1946 – via Internet Archive.
- Lloyd's Register of Shipping. Vol. II.–M–Z. Steamers, Motorships, Sailing Vessels, &c. London: Lloyd's Register of Shipping. 1948 – via Internet Archive.
- Massey, Anne (2020). Designing Liners: A History of Interior Design Afloat. London: Routledge. ISBN 978-0367858964.
- Miller, William H (1981). Great Luxury Liners 1927–1954: A Photographic Record. New York: Dover Publications. ISBN 978-0486240565.
- Miller, William H (2002). Picture History of German and Dutch Passenger Ships. New York: Dover Publications. ISBN 978-0486420639.
- Miller, William H (2010). SS Nieuw Amsterdam: The Darling of the Dutch. Chalford: Amberley Publishing. ISBN 978-1848683662.
- Mitchell, WH; Sawyer, LA (1967). Cruising Ships. Merchant ships of the world series. Garden City, NY: Doubleday. OCLC 228670269.
- Smith, H Gerrish (1938). "The Ship of the Year". Pacific Marine Review. Consolidated 1938 issues (June): 21.
- Wilson, RM (1956). The Big Ships. London: Cassell & Co.
