= Jan van Gilse =

Dutch conductor and composer (1881–1944)

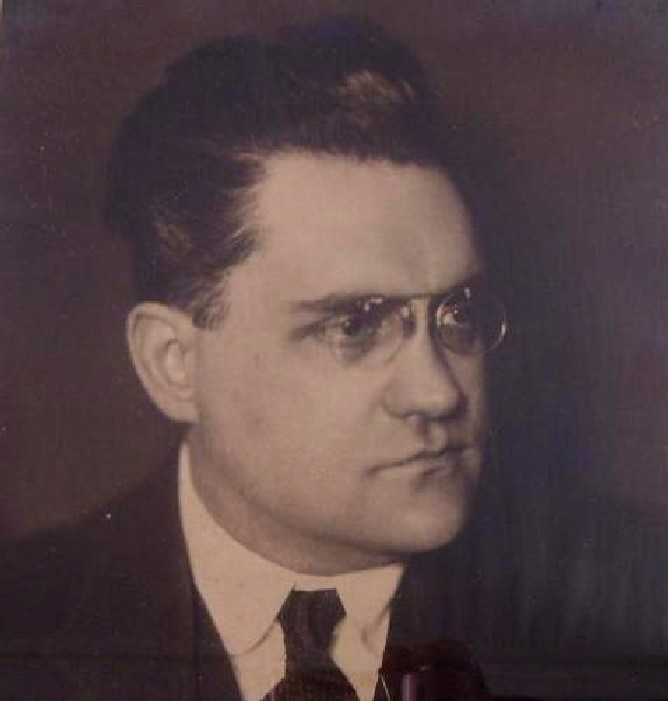
- Van Gilse, c. 1930
- Born: Jan Pieter Hendrik van Gilse; 11 May 1881; Rotterdam, South Holland, Netherlands
- Died: 8 September 1944 (aged 63); Oegstgeest, South Holland, Netherlands
- Occupations: Conductor; composer
- Years active: early 1900s – 1941

Jan Pieter Hendrik van Gilse (11 May 1881 – 8 September 1944) was a Dutch conductor and composer. Among his works are five symphonies and the Dutch-language opera Thijl (1940).

== Life ==
Coming from a family of theologians, Jan van Gilse showed an early aptitude for piano playing and composing. From 1897 onwards, he studied at the Cologne Conservatory. After his teacher, Franz Wüllner, died in 1902, he continued his studies with Engelbert Humperdinck in Berlin. From 1909 to 1911, he studied in Italy. In 1901, van Gilse received the Beethoven-Haus Prize in Bonn for his (First) Symphony in F major; in 1906, the Michael Beer Prize was awarded to him for his Third Symphony, 'Erhebung' ('Elevation'; for solo soprano and orchestra).

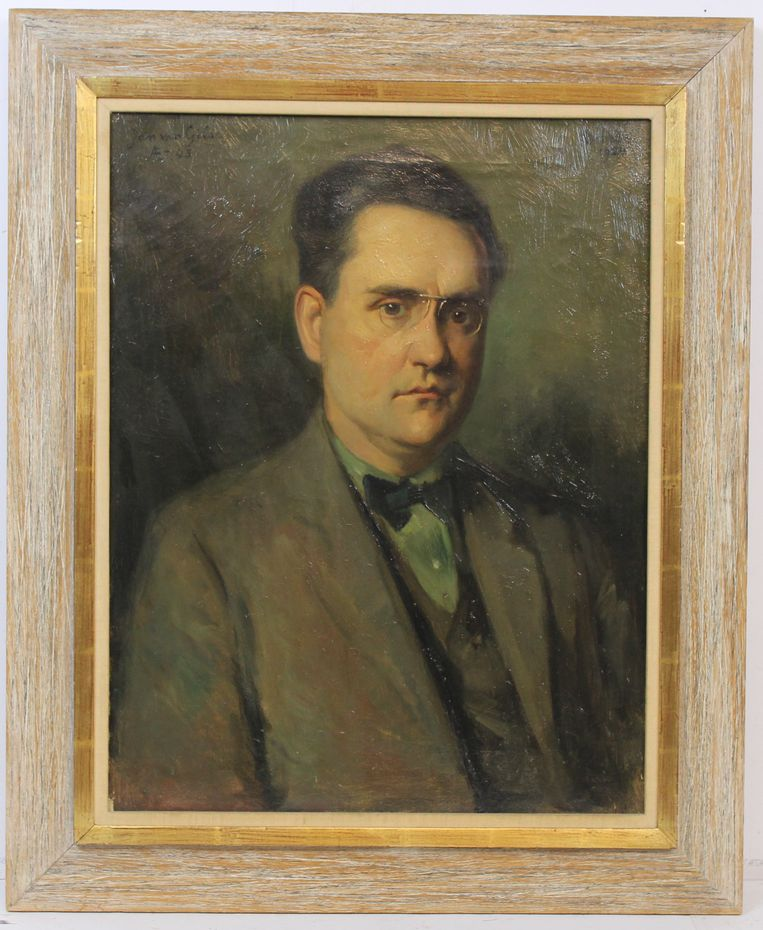
1924 portrait of van Gilse by Hendrik Maarten Krabbé

In addition to composing, van Gilse soon developed an interest in conducting. He started out with the Bremen Opera, a post which was followed by appointments in Munich and Amsterdam. After the outbreak of the First World War made travel difficult, he moved back to the Netherlands. From 1917 until 1922, he was the conductor of the Utrecht Municipal Orchestra (Utrechtsch Stedelijk Orkest).

In 1921, van Gilse resigned from the position after a conflict with the orchestra's board of directors. He had been attacked for some time by the composer and music critic Willem Pijper in the daily Utrechts Dagblad, attacks that grew in viciousness as time progressed. Van Gilse's request that Pijper be denied access to concerts was stalled for so long that he lost faith and resigned. The board subsequently refused him a farewell concert.

Eight years later, van Gilse put the experiences from his tenure in Utrecht into writing. The autobiography that materialised was sizeable and contained almost 350,000 words. However, because he didn't spare anyone or anything (including himself), van Gilse doubted whether the manuscript would ever see the light of day. It was eventually edited and published in 2003.

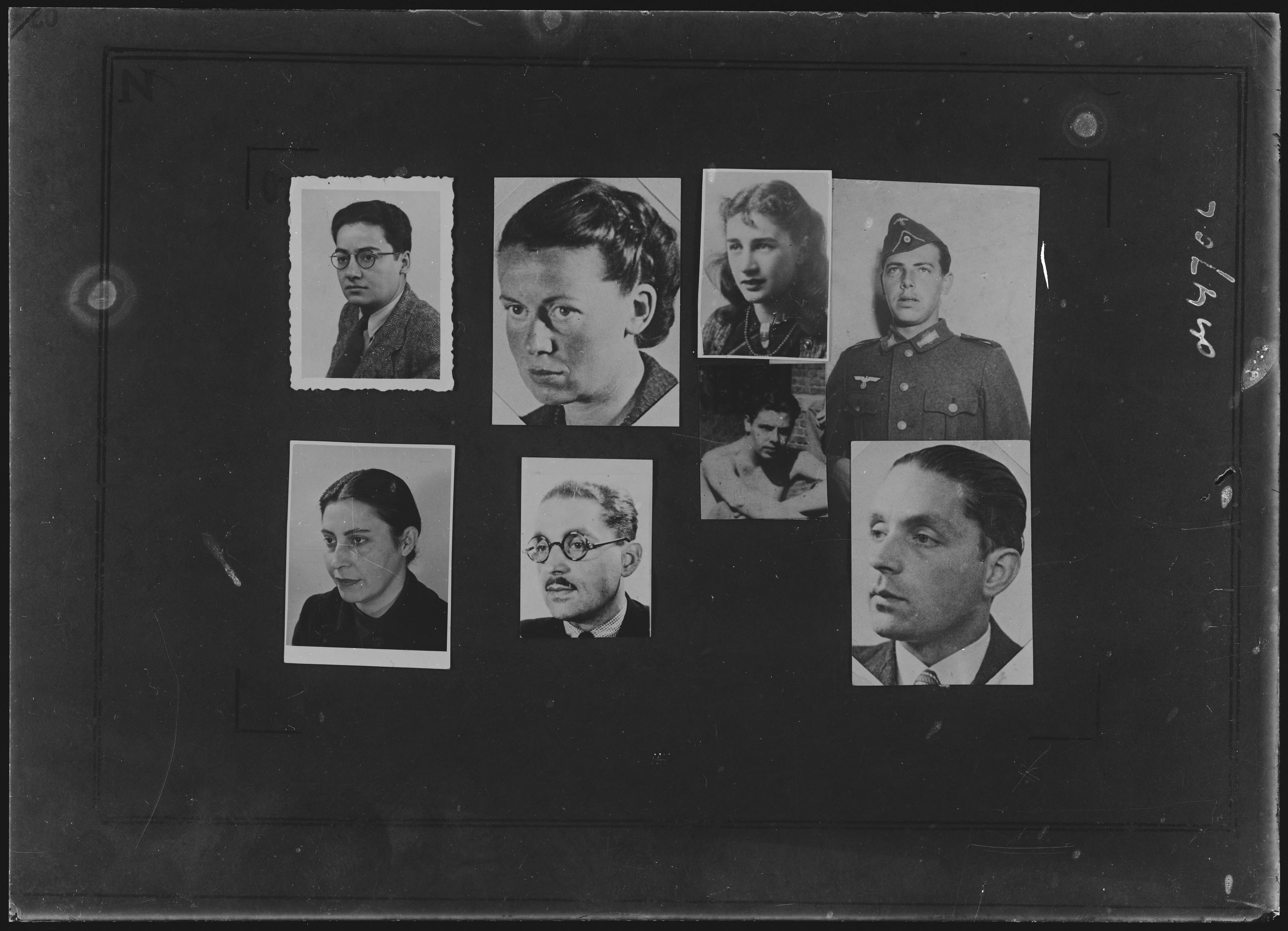
Photographs of suspects of resistance activities, including van Glise, commissioned by the Sicherheitsdienst, 1943. From top left: Frieda Belinfante, Geertruida Maria van Everdingen, Marianne Helen van den Brink, unidentified man, Helena Suzanna van Hall, Jan Hendrik van Gilse in disguise, Marcel Verwiel, and again, van Gilse.

During World War II, van Gilse became actively involved with the resistance movement against the German occupation of the Netherlands. Both of his sons, who were also resistance fighters, were killed by the occupiers before van Gilse himself succumbed (probably to pneumonia) in the autumn of 1944. To protect his shelter, he was buried in an unmarked grave outside the village of Oegstgeest.

== Organiser ==
From 1933 to 1937, van Gilse served as director of the Utrecht Conservatory. He was also active in protecting the interests of composers in the Netherlands. In 1911, he was one of the founders of the Society of Dutch Musicians (Genootschap van Nederlandse Componisten or GeNeCo). One year later, he was instrumental in founding the Dutch Bureau for Musical Copyrights (Buma).

== Work and reputation ==
Van Gilse's early style is indebted to German late romanticism. However, after around 1920, it became more modernist. His opera Thijl (1940), often regarded as his masterpiece and arguably the most important opera in Dutch musical history, is one of his last works and a totally individual conception. An attempt by the German occupiers to destroy all of van Gilse's work was prevented by his collaborators.

Recently, interest in van Gilse has increased, helped by the publication of his autobiography (edited by Hans van Dijk) and a biography. The German record label CPO has recorded his four completed symphonies, with plans under way to record the opera Thijl in the near future, all under the direction of conductor David Porcelijn.

== Selected list of works ==
- Symphonies:
  - Symphony No. 1 in F major (1900–01; recorded)
  - Symphony No. 2 in E♭ major (1902–1903; recorded)
  - Symphony No. 3 in D minor, "Erhebung" for soprano and orchestra (1906-7; recorded)
  - Symphony No. 4 in A major (1910–1915; recorded)
  - Symphony No. 5 in D major (fragment; 1922)
- Orchestral works:
  - Concert Overture in C minor (1900; recorded)
  - Variations on a St. Nicholas Song (1908; recorded)
  - Three Dance Sketches for piano and small orchestra (1925–26; recorded as "Piano Concerto")
  - Prologus brevis (1928)
  - Praeludium to "Der Kreis des Lebens" (1928)
  - Small Waltz (1936)
  - Treurmuziek bij den dood van Uilenspiegel, from the opera Thijl (1940; recorded)
  - Andante con moto (date uncertain, after 1935)
- Works for voice(s) and orchestra:
  - Sulamith, cantata for soprano and orchestra (1901–02; recorded)
  - Eine Lebensmesse, cantata after Richard Dehmel (1903–04; recorded)
  - Gitanjali Songs for soprano and orchestra
  - Der Kreis des Lebens, cantata (1928–1929; recorded)
  - Rotterdam, declamatorium on a text by Jan Prins (unfinished; 1942)
- Operas:
  - Frau Helga von Stavern, opera on a text by Van Gilse, in German (1911–13)
  - Thijl, opera after Charles de Coster's novel The heroic, jolly and notorious acts of Uilenspiegel and Lamme Goedzak in Flanders Country and elsewhere, on a libretto by Hendrik Lindt (1940; recorded)
- Chamber pieces:
  - Nonet, for oboe, clarinet, bassoon, horn, 2 violins, viola, cello and double bass (1916)
  - String Quartet, an unfinished string quartet (1922)
  - Trio for flute, violin and viola (1927)

== See also ==
- German Romanticism
- Dutch resistance
