= Monument Indië-Nederland =

1935 monument in Amsterdam, Netherlands

- Monumen Hindia Belanda
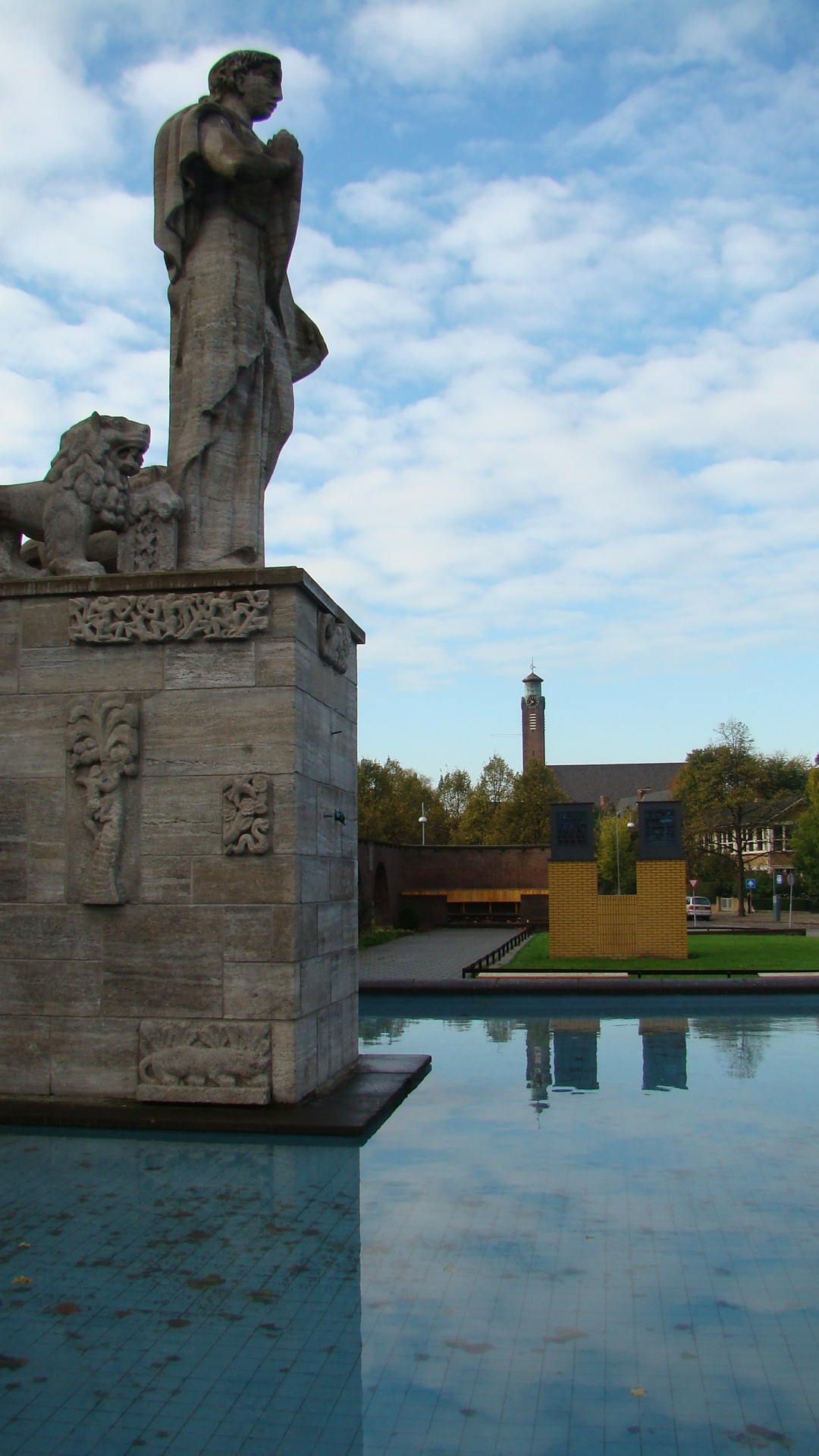
- Part of the monument
- Interactive map of Monument Indië-Nederland
- Location: Amsterdam, Netherlands
- Coordinates: 52°21′1″N 4°51′56″E
- Designer: Friedhoff and Van Hall
- Material: Stone
- Height: 18.7 metres (61 ft)
- Opening date: 15 June 1935
- Dedicated to: J. B. van Heutsz (3 February 1851 – 11 July 1924); East Indies–Netherlands (2004–present)

The Monument Indië-Nederland is located near the Olympiaplein in the southern part of Amsterdam. The monument was originally a memorial for General J. B. van Heutsz, who was the commandant of the Royal Netherlands East Indies Army and is also known for conquering Aceh for the Kingdom of the Netherlands in 1903 following the Aceh War. Because of political pressure the name was changed in 2004 to Monument Indië-Nederland.

== Background ==
After his death in 1924, a mausoleum was built for Van Heutsz on the Nieuwe Oosterbegraafplaats. After the mausoleum was completed, there was still a bit of the collected money left, with which the committee responsible for its construction decided to build two more monuments to him, one in Batavia and the other in Amsterdam. After the government agreed to the idea in 1930 to build a monument with this money in another part of Amsterdam, they started a contest. This contest was won by the architect Gijsbert Friedhoff and the sculptor Frits van Hall. Although there were strong protests from communists and social democrats, the monument was unveiled by Queen Wilhelmina, in the presence of princess Juliana and prime minister Colijn in 1935. The monument consists of a female character with a lion on each side, meant to symbolise Dutch supremacy over the conquered people of the Dutch East Indies. The monument is surrounded by a pond and a stone wall.

== Symbolism ==
Almost every part of the monument symbolizes the relations between the Netherlands and Indonesia. The female character in the center with the scroll of law in her hand, represents the Dutch authority in Indonesia. On each side of her is a lion, who both symbolize a city. One of them stands for Batavia, the old name of the capital of the Dutch East Indies, the other one stands for Amsterdam. In popular speech the woman is also called Mien met de hondjes (Mien with the dogs) because of the two lions the woman is surrounded by.

On the pedestal used to be a portrait of general Van Heutsz, but following significant criticism over Van Heutsz's actions during the Aceh War, the portrait was removed and the name of the monument was changed from the Van Heutsz monument to the Monument Indië-Nederland. After the plaquette with the portrait had been removed, it was stolen in 1984.

The pond symbolizes the water that separates the Netherlands and Indonesia. On the walls with the arcs on the left and on the right of the statue are placed reliefs that represent the islands of the archipelago.

== Attacks and protests ==
Since 1935 the monument has been frequently damaged. The monument has been the target of bomb attacks twice, firsr in 1967, and second in 1984 as a protest against Amsterdam mayor Ed van Thijn visiting Suharto's Indonesia, leading to a 12-year-old boy being wounded. In 1943, Johan Bastiaan Heutsz, the son of general Van Heutsz, protested against the monument in 1943 because in his opinion the monument was too "weak", and sought to use his influence as a member of the Waffen-SS to get the monument demolished. After the attack in 1984 and the theft of the portrait of van Heutsz earlier that year in June to protest the imprisonment of draft dodgers, peace returned around the monument, with the notable exception of the letters of Van Heutsz's name being stolen in 1991, until 1997, when the government wanted to renovate the monument. The protests returned and the government decided to only sand blast the monument.

== Changes after the unveiling ==
Since the monument was unveiled, a few changes have been made to it. In 2004 the proposal to contribute the monument to Multatuli was rejected and it became a memorial that shows the relations between Indonesia and the Netherlands. That the monument became a memorial became clear in 2007 when a few changes were made:

- Brick pedestals were added to the monument. The difference between the eastern (Indonesia) and the western (Netherlands) part of the monument were expressed by the different colors.
- Six different dates were added to the monument:
  - 1596, the landing of Cornelis de Houtman and Pieter Dirkszoon Keyser at Banten
  - 1935, the unveiling of the statue
  - 1945, the Proclamation of Indonesian Independence
  - 1949, Dutch recognition of Indonesian independence
  - 2001, change of function and name
  - 2007, expansion of the monument
