= Suzy van Hall =

Dutch dancer

Suzy van Hall

Helena Suzanna van Hall (April 28, 1907 – July 1978) was a Dutch dancer.

She was born in The Hague, the younger sister of sculptor Frits van Hall. In 1932, she married Cees Kelk. Van Hall had a dance studio in Paris, performed there and also toured England, Switzerland and Tunisia. The couple grew apart: in part because of the demands of her career and in part because of his affair with their au pair. They divorced in 1938.

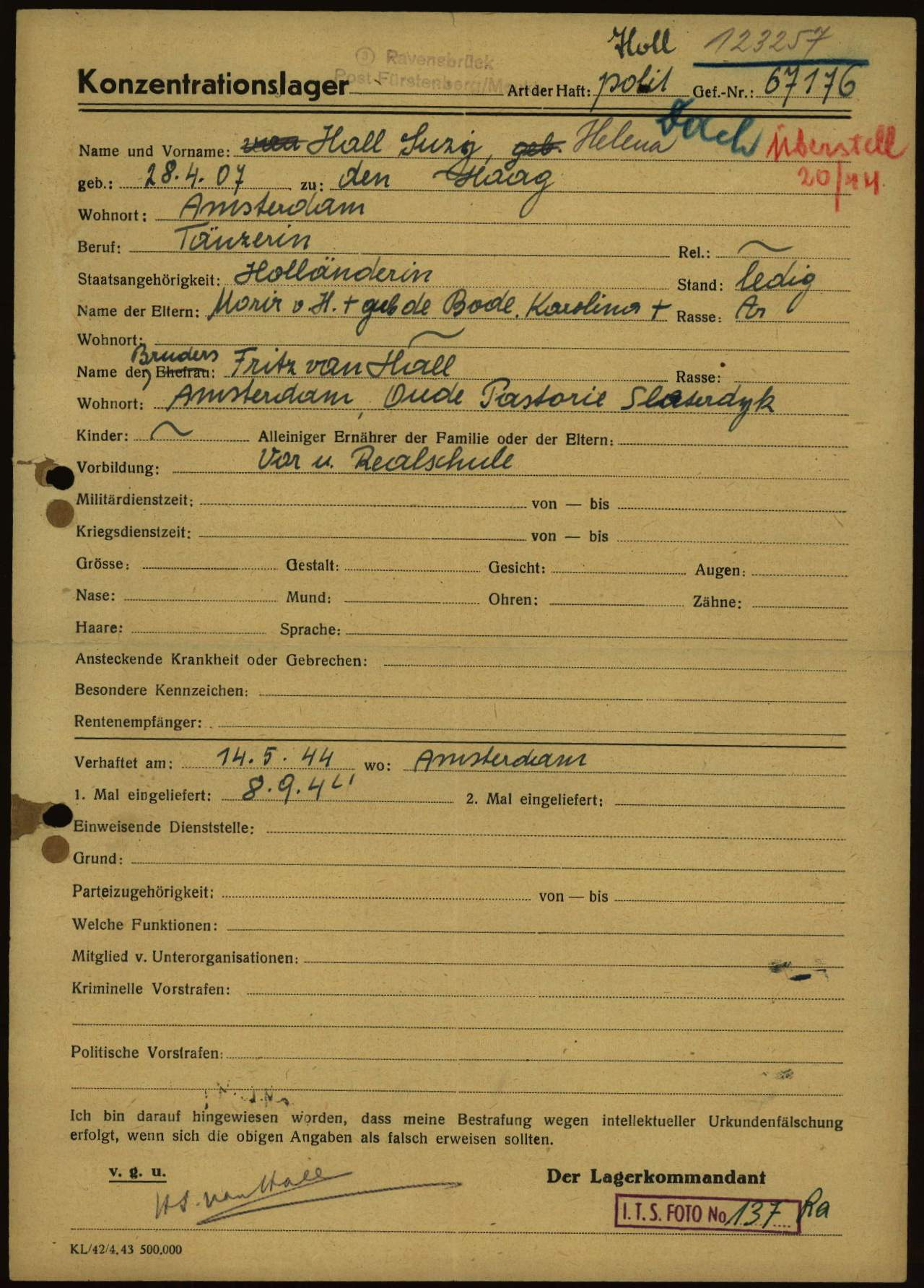
Registration form of Suzy van Hall as a prisoner at Ravensbrück Nazi Concentration Camp

She was involved in the Dutch resistance during World War II with her lover Gerrit Jan van der Veen. In 1944, she was arrested and convicted of manufacturing false identification, robbery and other offences; she was sent to Herzogenbusch, Ravensbrück, and finally Dachau concentration camp. Van Hall was liberated in April 1945.

After her release, she was taken in by Koos Schregardus and was given a position in the publishing company De Spieghel. Schregardus and van Hall published books about Gerrit van der Veen and Frits van Hall. Van Hall also did some translation for De Spieghel, including a Dutch version of Paul Brunton's book The Secret Path.

She died in Saint-Cybranet at the age of 71.
