= Frits van Hall =

Dutch painter and sculptor

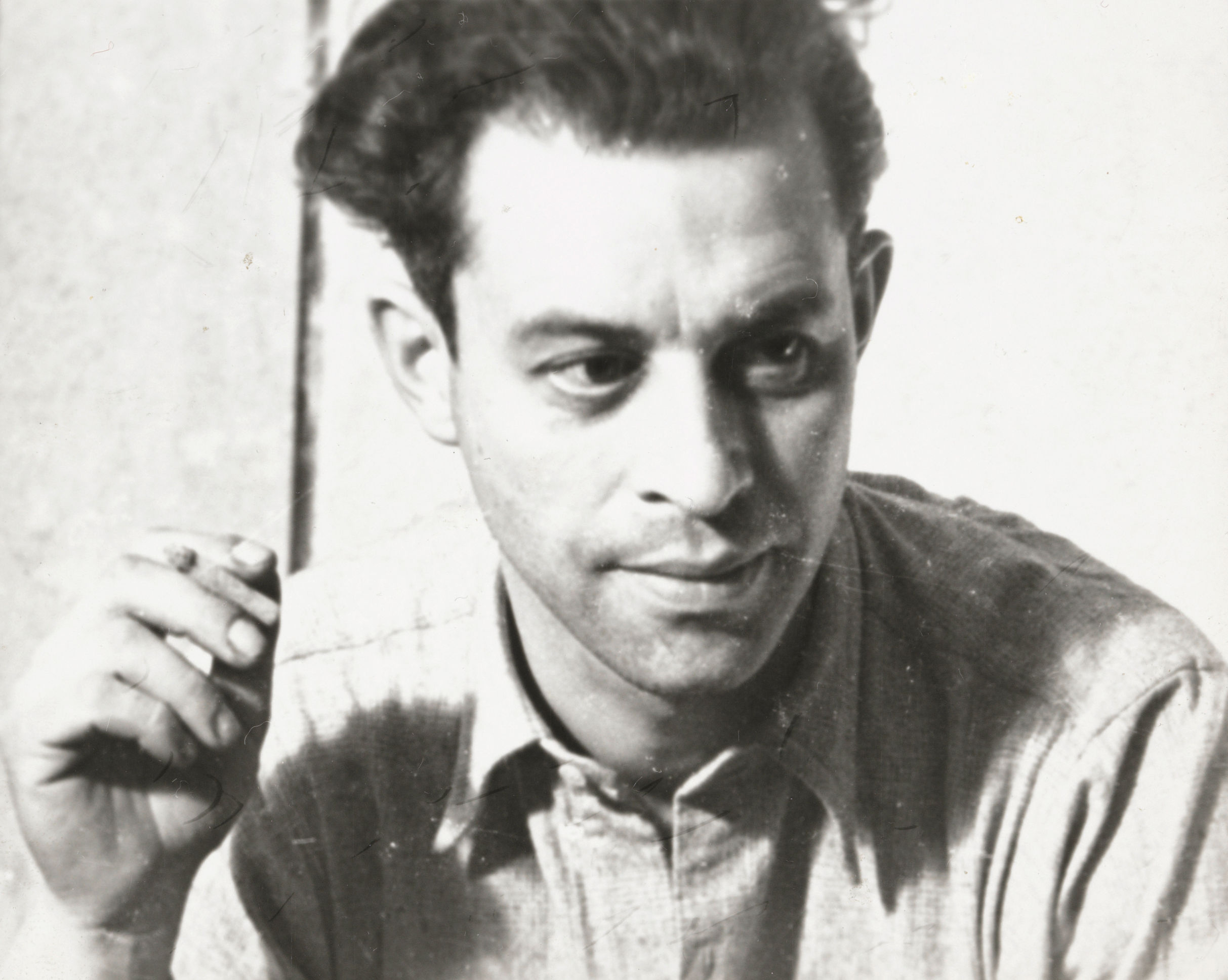

Frederik Jan (Frits) van Hall (8 May 1899 (Suikerfabriek Bodja near Semarang) – 18 January 1945 (Gliwice) was a Dutch sculptor executed for his role in the Dutch resistance in 1945.

Frits was born near Semarang in the Dutch East Indies. His family returned to the Netherlands in 1905. His sister, the dancer Suzy van Hall, was born in 1907.

He worked on the Van Heutsz monument, the Moerdijk monument and the decoration of the Enschede town hall.

== Gallery ==
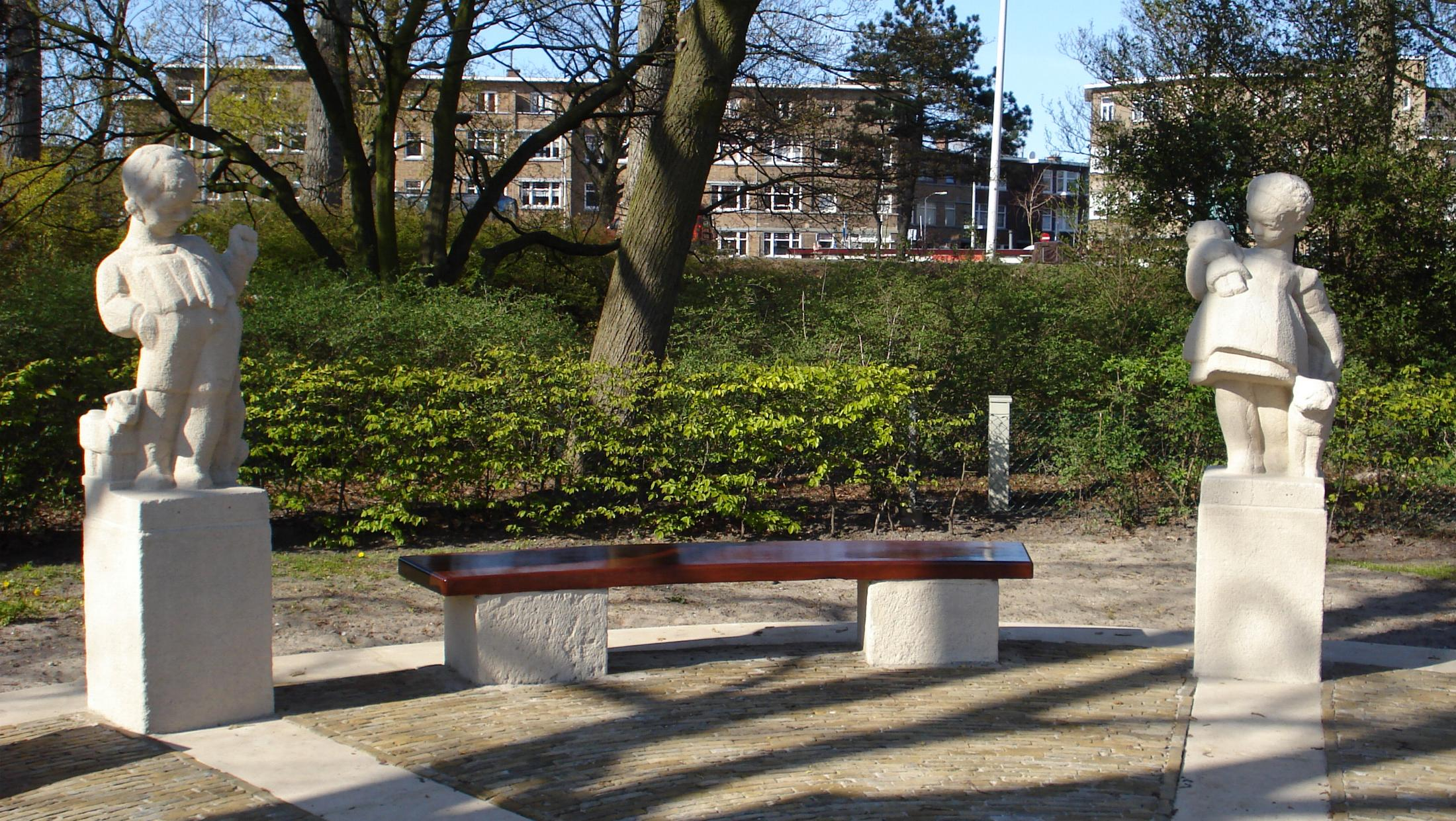
Ot en Sien, Den Haag

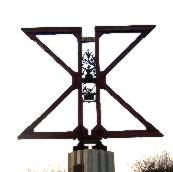
Monument Moerdijkbrug 1978

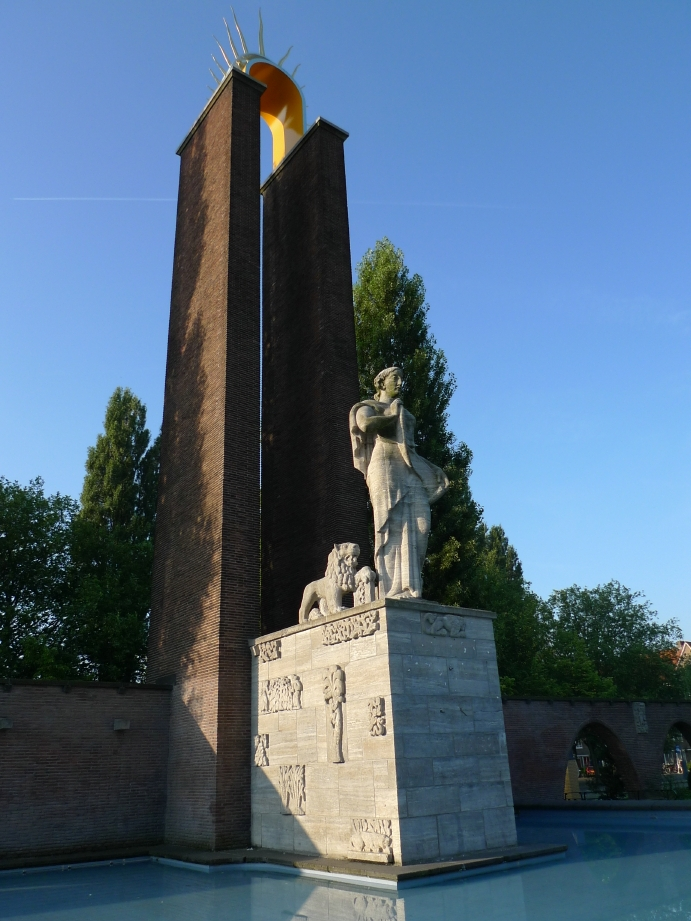
Monument Indië-Nederland, Amsterdam

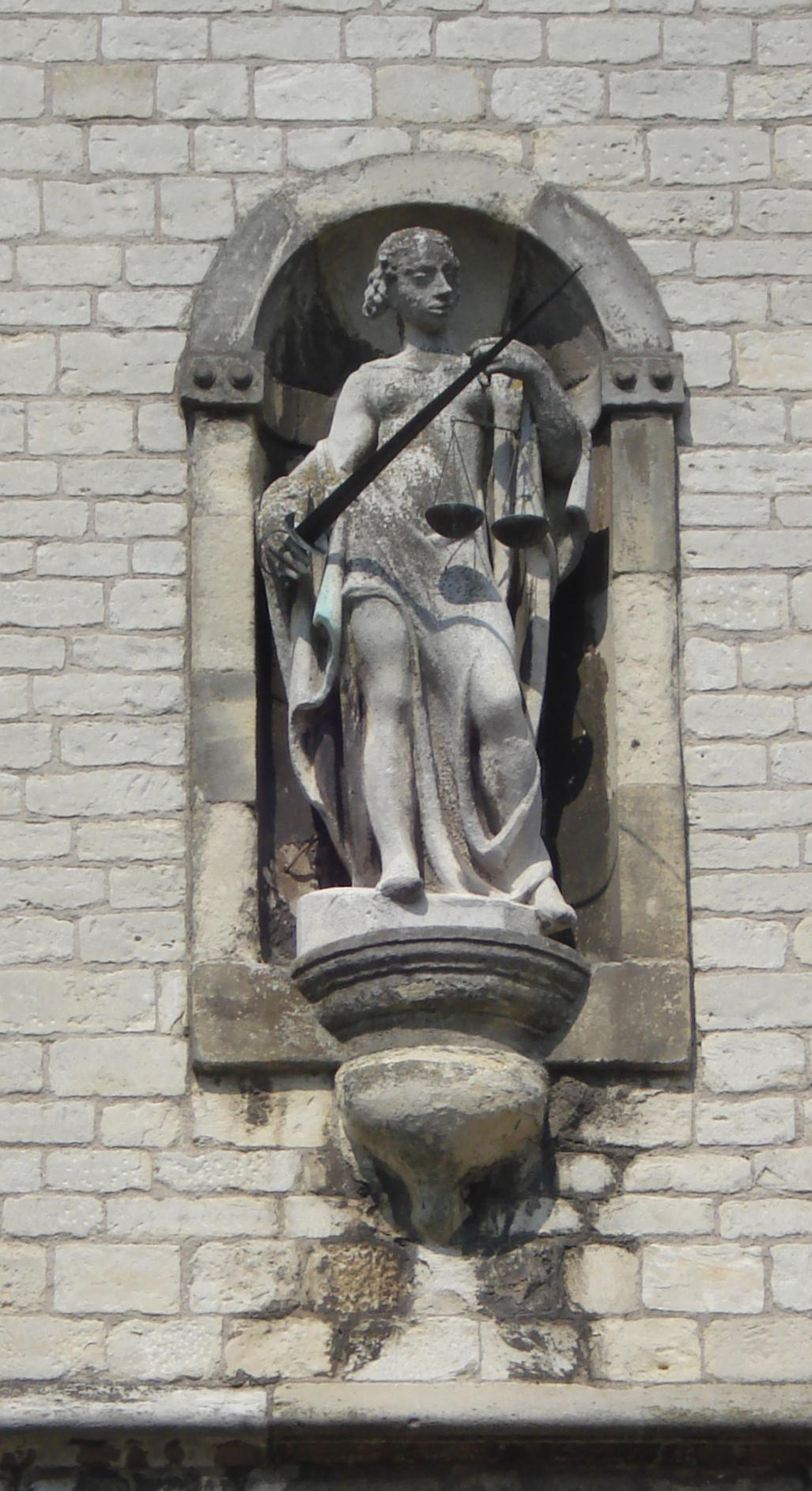
Rechtvaardigheid, Bergen op Zoom

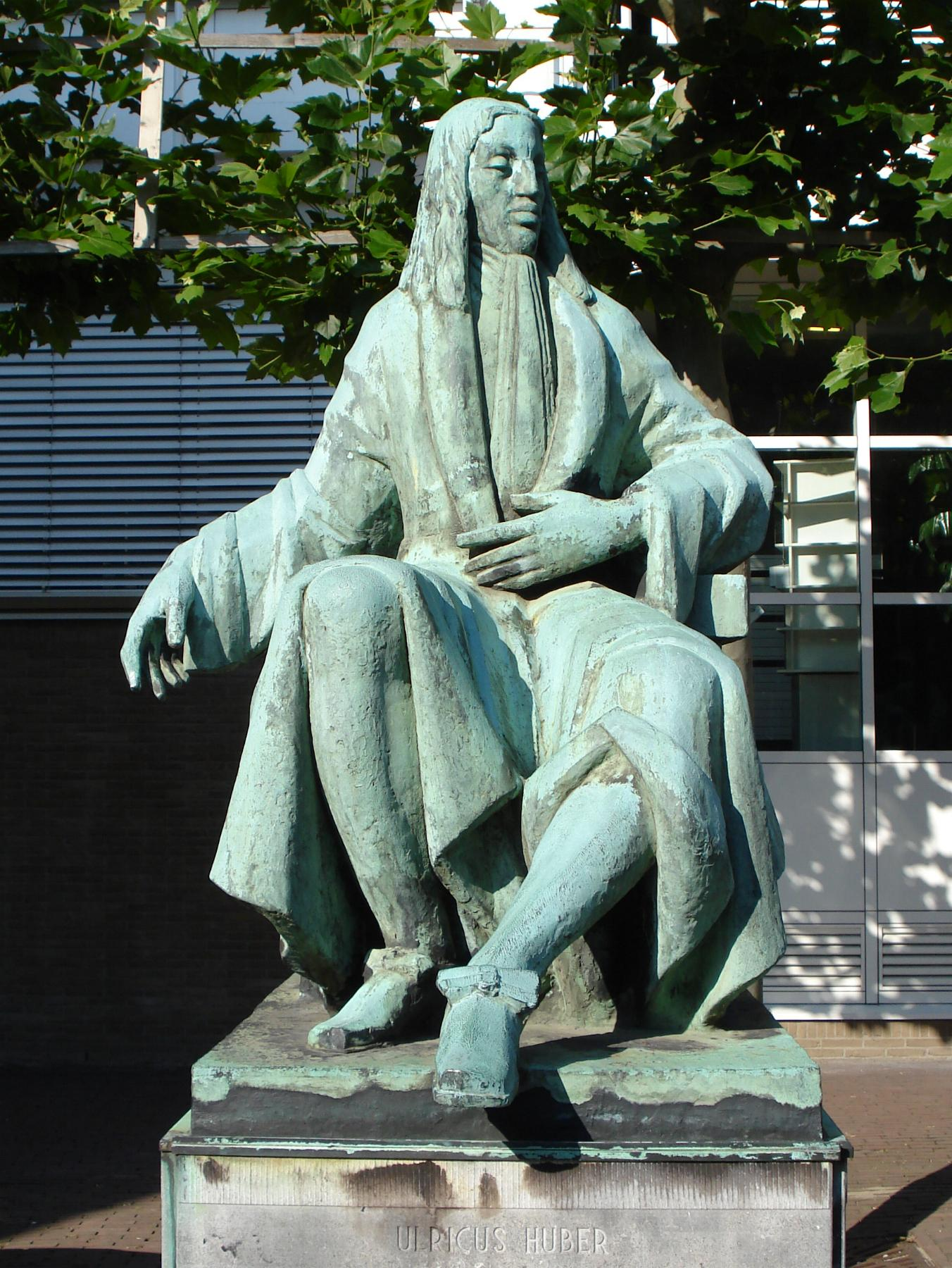
Ulricus Huber, Den Haag

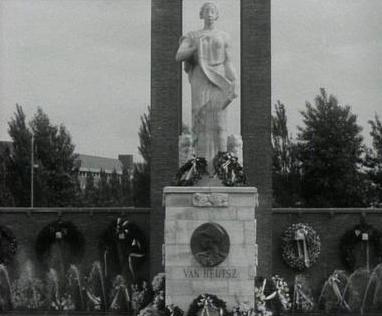
Unveiling of the Van Heutsz memorial, 1935
