= Leen Bolle =

Dutch sculptor

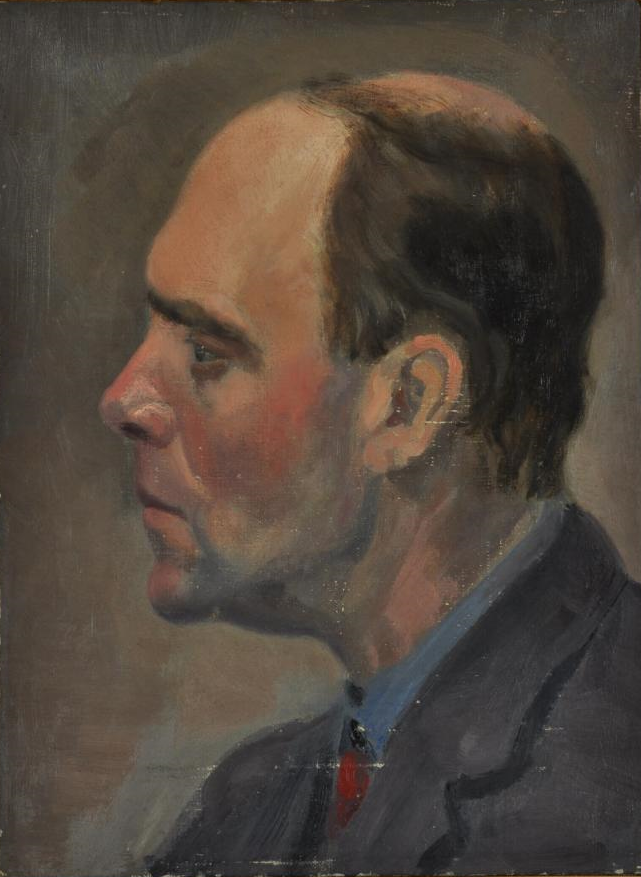
- Self portrait (undated)
- Born: 11 April 1879; Rotterdam, Netherlands
- Died: 13 December 1942 (aged 63); Velp, Netherlands
- Occupation: Sculptor

Leen Bolle (11 April 1879 – 13 December 1942) was a Dutch sculptor. His work was part of the sculpture event in the art competition at the 1928 Summer Olympics.
