= USS Culgoa =

British-built cargo steamship

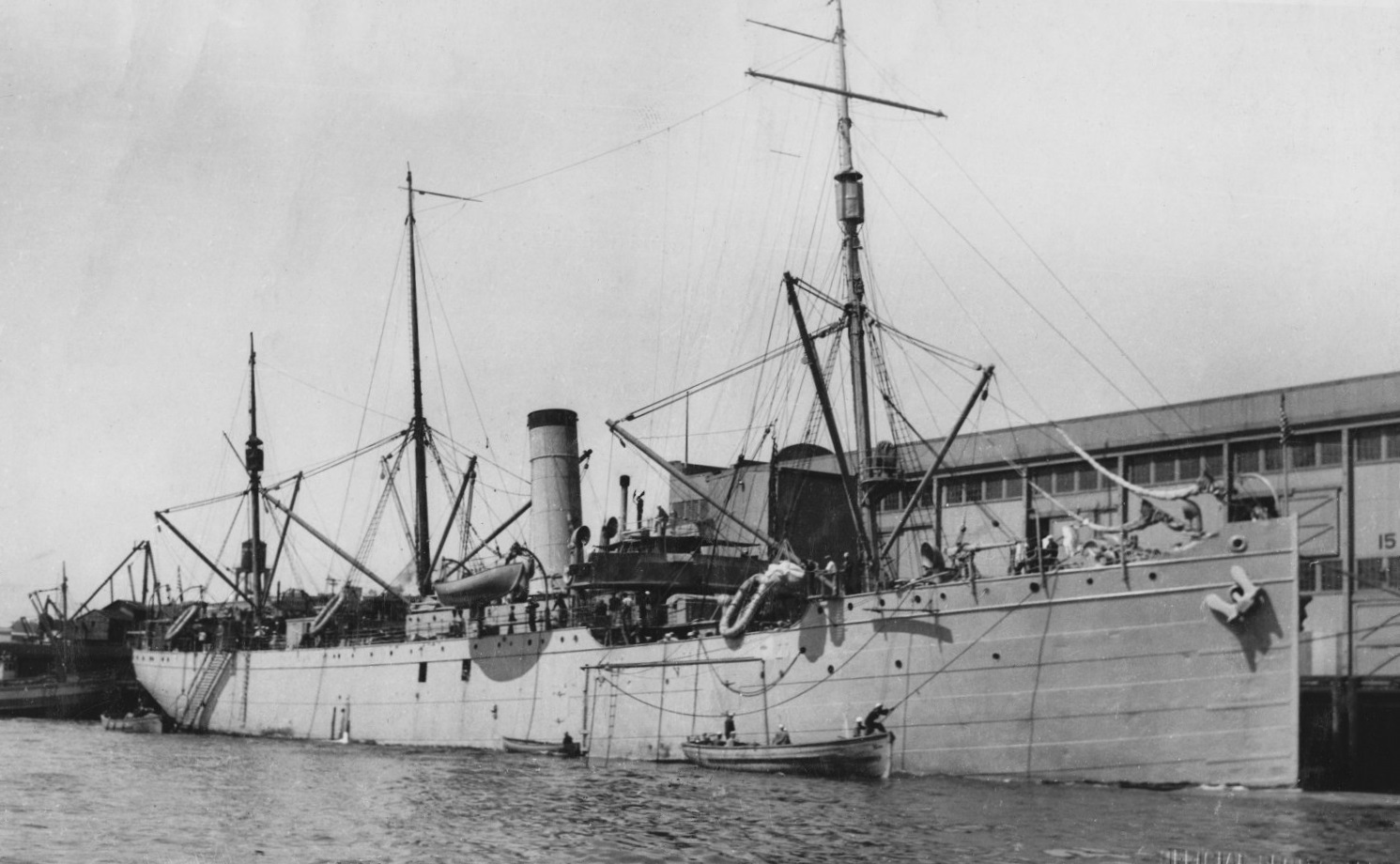
- Culgoa in Honolulu, 26 August 1920

History
- Name: 1889: Culgoa; 1922: Champlain
- Namesake: 1889: Culgoa, Victoria
- Owner: 1890: Wilhelm Lund; 1898: United States Navy; 1922: LH Stewart
- Operator: 1890: Blue Anchor Line
- Port of registry: 1890: (United Kingdom) London; 1922: (United States) New York
- Builder: JL Thompson & Sons, Sunderland
- Yard number: 257
- Launched: 25 October 1889
- Completed: 4 January 1890
- Acquired: for US Navy, 4 June 1898
- Commissioned: 3 December 1898
- Decommissioned: 16 October 1901
- Recommissioned: 1 October 1902
- Decommissioned: 11 August 1905
- Recommissioned: 12 September 1907
- Decommissioned: 31 December 1921
- Identification: 1890: UK official number 96681; 1890: code letters LMSQ; by 1914: call sign NDU; 1920: hull number AF-3; 1922: US official number 222721; 1922: code letters MDWH
- Fate: Scrapped, 1924

General characteristics
- Type: cargo liner
- Tonnage: 1891: 3,325 GRT, 2,135 NRT; by 1896: 3,444 GRT, 2,172 NRT
- Displacement: 6,000 long tons (6,096 t)
- Length: 346 ft 4 in (105.56 m) overall; 335.0 ft (102.1 m) registered
- Beam: 43.0 ft (13.1 m)
- Draft: 21 ft 9 in (6.63 m)
- Depth: 24.3 ft (7.4 m)
- Decks: 2
- Installed power: 1 × triple-expansion engine; 419 NHP
- Propulsion: 1 × screw
- Sail plan: schooner
- Speed: 13 knots (24 km/h)
- Capacity: as built: 1st & 3rd class passenger berths; by 1896: 43,058 cubic feet (1,219 m^{3}) of holds refrigerated
- Complement: in US Navy: 122 officers & enlisted
- Armament: in US Navy: 2 × 6-pounder guns
- Notes: sister ship: Bungaree

USS Culgoa (AF-3) was a steam cargo liner. She was launched in England in 1889 for Blue Anchor Line, who ran her between England and Australia. In 1898 she was bought for the United States Navy as a stores ship. She served in the Philippine–American War; the Great White Fleet; and the First World War. In January 1909 she took part in the relief operation after the 1908 Messina earthquake. To date, she is the only US Navy ship to have been named Culgoa. In 1922 the United States Department of the Navy sold her to a civilian owner, who renamed her Champlain. She was scrapped in the United States in 1924.

== Building ==
In 1889, shipyards in North East England launched two sister ships for Blue Anchor Line. The first was built by J Wigham Richardson & Co of Newcastle, and launched on 28 August as Bungaree. The second was built by J.L. Thompson and Sons of Sunderland as yard number 257; launched on 25 October as Culgoa; and completed on 4 January 1890. Her beam was a few inches greater than Bungaree's, but they were otherwise identical. She was named after the town of Culgoa in Victoria. Culgoa's lengths were 346 ft 4 in (105.56 m) overall and 335.0 ft (102.1 m) registered. Her beam was 43.0 ft (13.1 m); her depth was 24.3 ft (7.4 m); and her draft was 21 ft 9 in (6.63 m). As built, her tonnages were 3,325 GRT; 2,135 NRT; and 6,000 long tons (6,096 t) displacement. She had three masts. She had a well deck forward, but not aft. She had a single screw, driven by a three-cylinder triple-expansion engine that was rated at 419 NHP and gave her a speed of 13 knots (24 km/h).

Blue Anchor Line registered Culgoa in London. Her United Kingdom official number was 96681, and her code letters were LMSQ. By 1896, Blue Anchor had refrigerating equipment installed in 43,058 cubic feet (1,219 m^{3}) of Culgoa's holds to carry perishable cargo. Her tonnages were reassessed as 3,444 GRT and 2,172 NRT.

== US Navy service ==
=== Philippine–American War, 1898–1901 ===
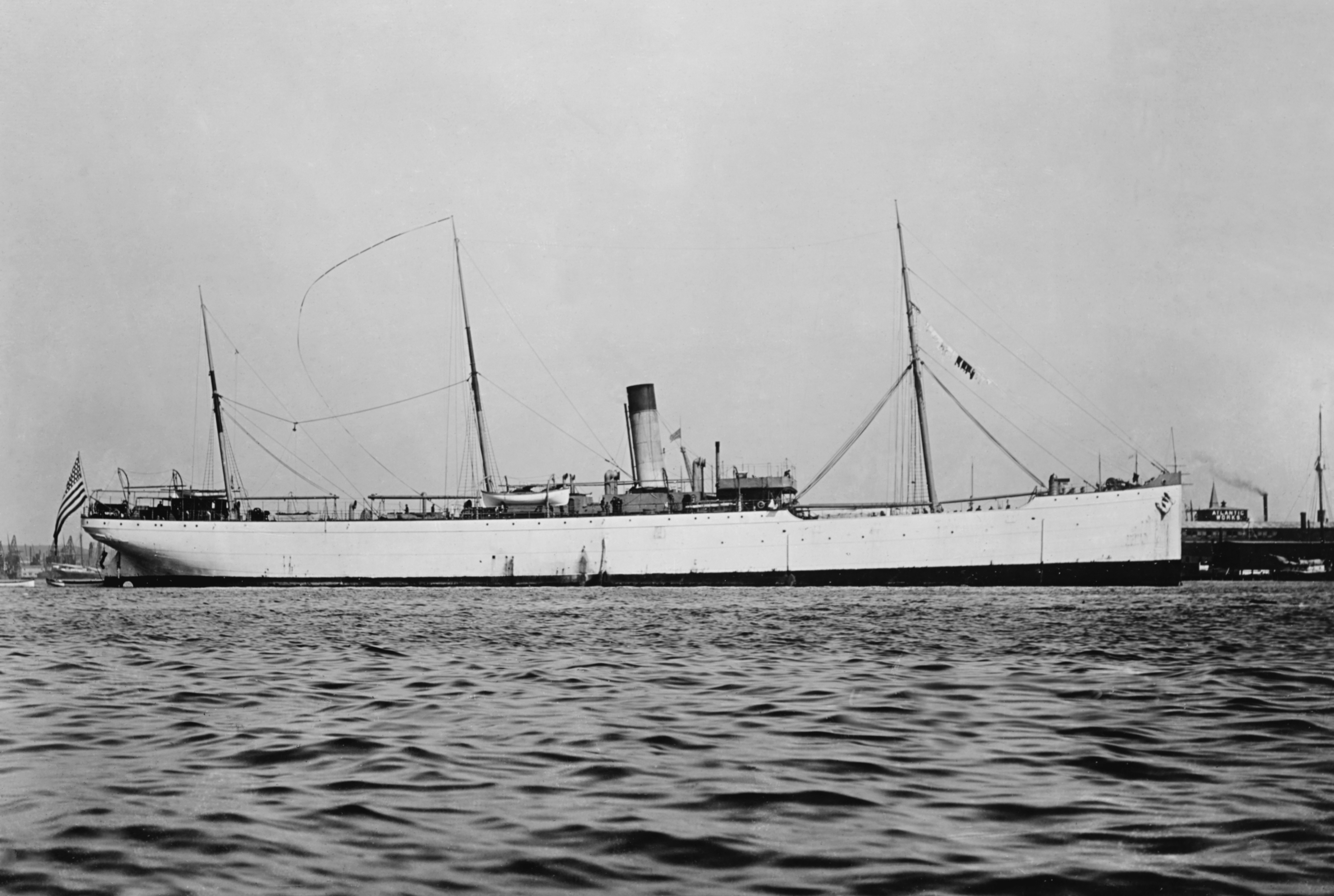
Culgoa off Boston Navy Yard on 1 October 1901, flying a paying-off pennant to mark her return from the Philippine–American War

The US Navy bought Calgoa in Cavite in the Philippines on 4 June 1898. She was commissioned on 3 December 1898, one week before the signing of the Treaty of Paris that ended the Spanish–American War. She was assigned to the Asiatic Squadron as a refrigerator supply ship, and operated from Cavite Navy Yard supplying ships and troops at Manila with ice and meat until August 1899. She was then appraised for possible sale, but instead was overhauled at Hong Kong between 20 October and 18 November 1899.

Culgoa made three voyages to Sydney, New South Wales and Brisbane, Queensland, for fresh stores in 1900 and 1901. On 21 January 1900, the Eastern and Australian Steamship Company coaster Airlie grounded on a reef at Chapman Island, Queensland. Culgoa, en route from Manila to Sydney, rescued Airlie's mail and 32 passengers, and landed them at Townsville. Airlie was later refloated and repaired.

On 22 July 1901, Culgoa left Cavite and sailed via Ceylon, the Suez Canal, Malta, and Gibraltar to New York, arriving on 25 September. She was decommissioned on 16 October 1901 at Boston.

=== North Atlantic Squadron, 1902–1905 ===
Culgoa was recommissioned on 1 October 1902, and assigned to the North Atlantic Squadron. Lieutenant Commander Robert Morris Doyle as her commanding officer from October 1902 to October 1904, when Lieut Cdr James Harrison Oliver relieved him.

On the evening of 9 November 1904, Culgoa accidentally rammed the schooner Wilson and Hunting about 10 nautical miles (19 km) off Barnegat Lighthouse, New Jersey. The night was clear, and both ships were headed north along the coast, and the steamship approached the schooner from astern. There was a blustery northeast wind, and the schooner was on a starboard tack. Wilson and Hunting was correctly lit, and lit a flare three times, which was the customary signal from a sailing craft to a steamer approaching from astern. Culgoa maintained her course; struck the schooner; and almost cut her in two. The impact was such that one member of the steamship's engine department crew was thrown against machinery and injured. Aboard the schooner, the steward and two seamen climbed the schooner's rigging to reach safety aboard the steamship. The Mate tried to do the same, but Culgoa went astern, separating the two ships, and he was thrown into the sea. The steamship lowered a boat, whose crew threw the Mate a line and rescued him. But after the two ships separated, Wilson and Hunting capsized, killing its Captain; his wife; and two Norwegian seamen. (One later report said four seamen.) The capsized schooner stayed afloat and drifted landwards, and two of the steamship's boats searched for more survivors, but found none. Culgoa then landed the four survivors at Tompkinsville, Staten Island. The capsized schooner drifted ashore at Long Beach, NJ. There it formed a hazard to other shipping, so a fortnight later it was destroyed with explosives.

Culgoa supplied ships and shore stations in the Caribbean and the Gulf of Mexico until 11 August 1905, when she was decommissioned again. She was considered for sale, and on 7 May 1906 she was struck from the Navy List, but on 30 June she was reinstated.

=== Great White Fleet, 1907–1909 ===
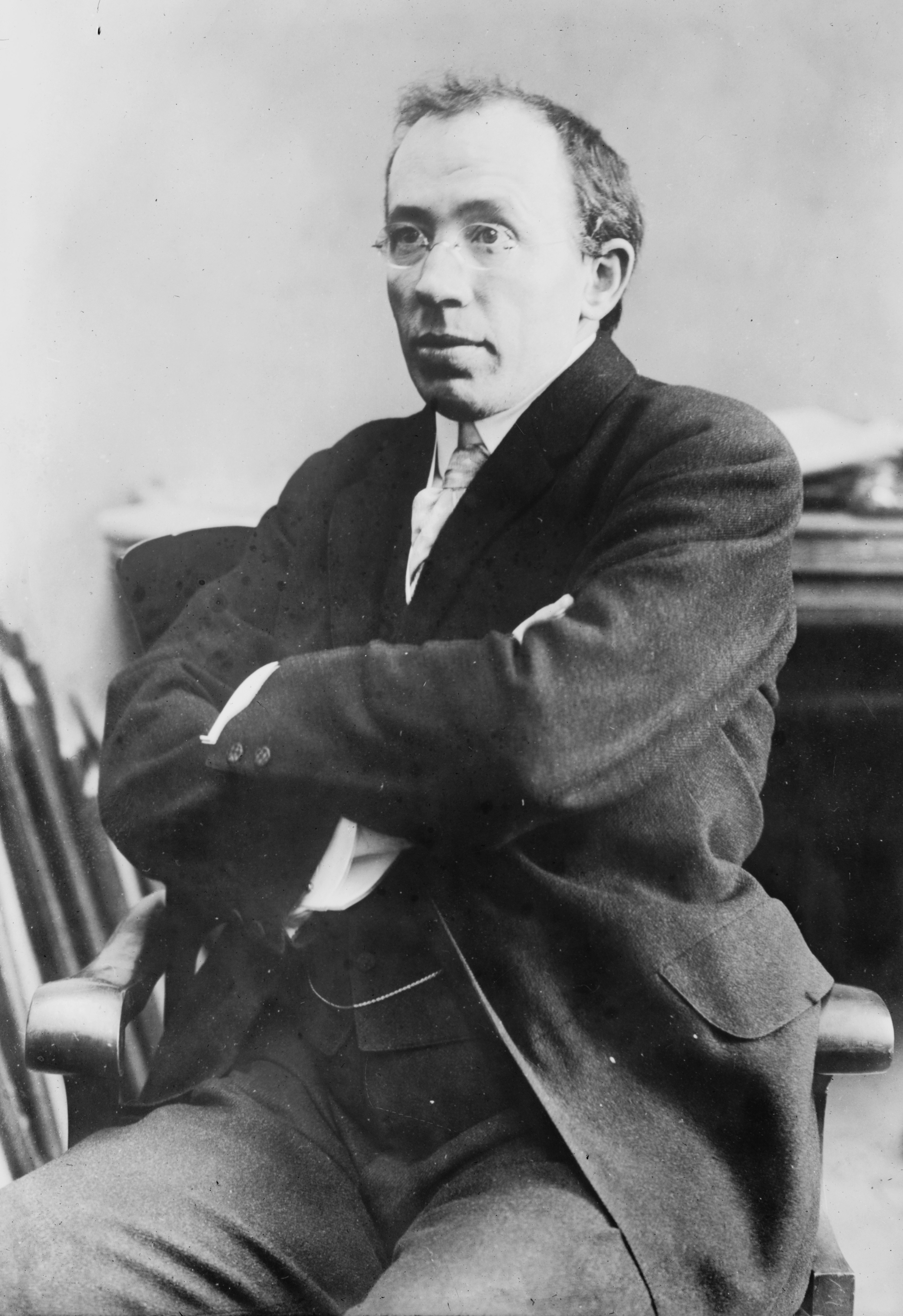
Henry Reuterdahl

On 12 September 1907, Culgoa was recommissioned again. She was loaned to the Panama Canal Railway, and on 21 September 1907 left New York carrying an emergency shipment of 500 tons of beef. She got back to New York on 16 October 1907.

On 11 December 1907, Culgoa left New York to join the Atlantic Battleship Fleet at Santa Lucia as stores ship, as one of four auxiliaries accompanying the 16 battleships on the cruise of the "Great White Fleet". On the cruise, while on a planned supply run, she carried naval artist Henry Reuterdahl, who painted a number of scenes of the expedition. At Amoy (Xiamen) in China, and in the Taiwan Strait between 28 October and 5 November 1908, she helped to establish wireless communications with the Second Squadron.

On 28 December 1908, an earthquake struck Messina, Italy. On 3 January 1909 the Great White Fleet reached Port Said from Colombo. USS Yankton was immediately sent through the Suez Canal to make for Messina. Culgoa followed a few hours after her, carrying food and drink; beds and bedding; six surgeons; and a number of other hospital staff. Yankton reached Messina on 9 January, followed by Culgoa.

=== Atlantic and Caribbean, 1909–1919 ===
Culgoa returned to Hampton Roads on 17 February 1909, and resumed her supply duties along the Atlantic coast and in the Caribbean until 1 December 1910, when she went to supply ships serving in European waters. She called at Brest and Cherbourg in France, and Weymouth and Gravesend in England, and returned to New York on 20 January 1911. She left New York 11 February 1911 for the Caribbean, where she supplied US ships and shore detachments until 1918. Commander Julian Lane Latimer was her commanding officer from 11 October 1911 until 10 May 1912. She assisted US military invertentions in Mexico; the US invasion of Haiti; and the US invasion of the Dominican Republic. By 1914, Culgoa was equipped with wireless telegraphy. Her call sign was NDU. In November 1916, she struck a submerged obstruction off Puerto Plata, Dominican Republic,which caused her to lose her propeller. USS Prairie and the tugboat Potomac went to her aid.

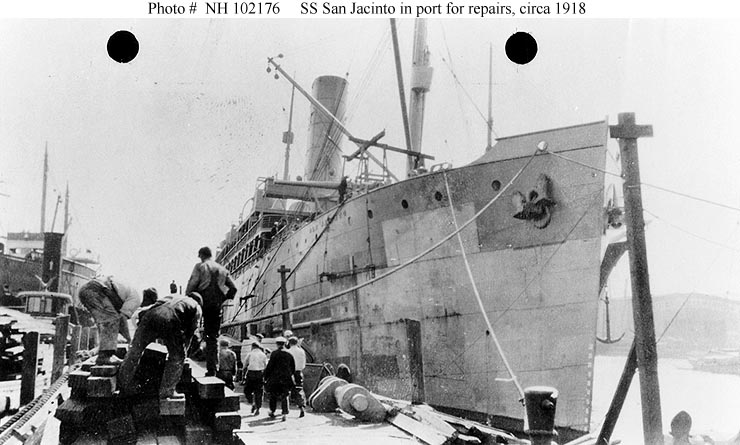
San Jacinto in port after the collision with USS Oosterdijk

In February 1918, Culgoa was then transferred to the Naval Overseas Transportation Service for the remainder of World War I. She made seven transatlantic convoy voyages to bases in France and Britain between 19 February 1918 and 10 May 1919. On 10 July 1918 she assisted USS Oosterdijk, which sank after a collision with San Jacinto. She rescued survivors, and towed San Jacinto into Halifax, Nova Scotia.

=== Pacific, 1920–1922 ===
Culgoa issued stores and provisions to Battle Squadron 2 at Guantanamo Bay from 24 March to 6 April 1920, then after supplying shore installations at Yorktown and Philadelphia, she left Brooklyn on 2 June for fleet maneuvers in the Pacific. On 17 July 1920 she was given the hull classification symbol AF-3. She joined Battle Squadron 2 at Colón, Panama, transited the Panama Canal, and joined in fleet problems on her way to Pearl Harbor, visiting Seattle and San Francisco. She returned to New York on 3 September 1920 for overhaul, and resumed supply operations on the East Coast and in the Caribbean from February to October 1921. The Navy decommissioned her for the final time at New York City on 31 December 1921.

== Champlain ==
On 25 July 1922, LH Stewart bought Culgoa. He renamed her Champlain, and registered her in New York. Her US official number was 222721, and her code letters were MDWH. She was scrapped in New York in the third quarter of 1924.

== Bibliography ==
- Haws, Duncan; Rabson, Stephen (1978). The Ships of the P&O, Orient and Blue Anchor Lines. Merchant Fleets in Profile. Vol. 1. Cambridge: Patrick Stephens Ltd. ISBN 0-85059-319-0.
- Lloyd's Register of British and Foreign Shipping. Vol. I.–Steamers. London: Lloyd's Register of Shipping. 1891 – via Internet Archive.
- Lloyd's Register of British and Foreign Shipping. Vol. I.–Steamers. London: Lloyd's Register of Shipping. 1896 – via Internet Archive.
- Lloyd's Register of Shipping. Vol. II.–Steamers and Motorships. London: Lloyd's Register of Shipping. 1924 – via Internet Archive.
- The Marconi Press Agency Ltd (1914). The Year Book of Wireless Telegraphy and Telephony. London: The Marconi Press Agency Ltd.
- Mercantile Navy List. London: Registrar General of Shipping and Seamen. 1891 – via Crew List Index Project.
- Mowbray, Jay Henry (1909). Italy's Great Horror of Earthquake and Tidal Wave. Washington, DC: GW Bertron.
