= Bungaree (disambiguation) =

Bungaree may refer to:

== People ==
- Bungaree (died 1830), an Awabakal Aboriginal Australian explorer, entertainer and diplomat

== Places ==
- Bungaree, South Australia
- Bungaree, Tasmania
- Bungaree, Victoria

== Ships ==
- SS Bungaree (1889), a steamship built in 1889 and scrapped in 1924
- HMAS Bungaree, a steamship built in 1937 and scrapped in 1968
- Bungaree, an Emerald-class ferry built in 2017

== Other ==
- Bungaree Primary School, Rockingham, Western Australia
