= Wakool (disambiguation) =

Wakool is a town in New South Wales, Australia

Wakool may also refer to:

- Wakool County, a cadastral divisions of New South Wales
- Wakool River, an anabranch of the Edward River in the western Riverina region of south western New South Wales, Australia
- Wakool Shire, formerly a local government area in the Riverina region of New South Wales, Australia
- SS Wakool, a Blue Anchor Line ship that entered service in 1898
