= Westerdijk =

Westerdijk can refer to:

- Johanna Westerdijk (1883–1961), Dutch plant pathologist
- SS Westerdijk, Dutch cargo ship serving 1912–1919
- Westerdijk Institute, plant research institute in the Netherlands
