= Frederick Lund =

British businessman (1874–1965)

- Born: 8 December 1874
- Died: 4 July 1965
- Occupation: Businessman

Frederick William Lund (8 December 1874 – 4 July 1965) was a British businessman and one of the proprietors of Messrs. W. Lund and Sons, owners of the Blue Anchor Line shipping company.

Their steamer, Waratah, disappeared without a trace between Durban and Cape Town in July 1909, while making her second voyage from Australia to the United Kingdom. Frederick Lund gave evidence to an inquiry into the disappearance at London in December 1910.
