= SS Geelong =

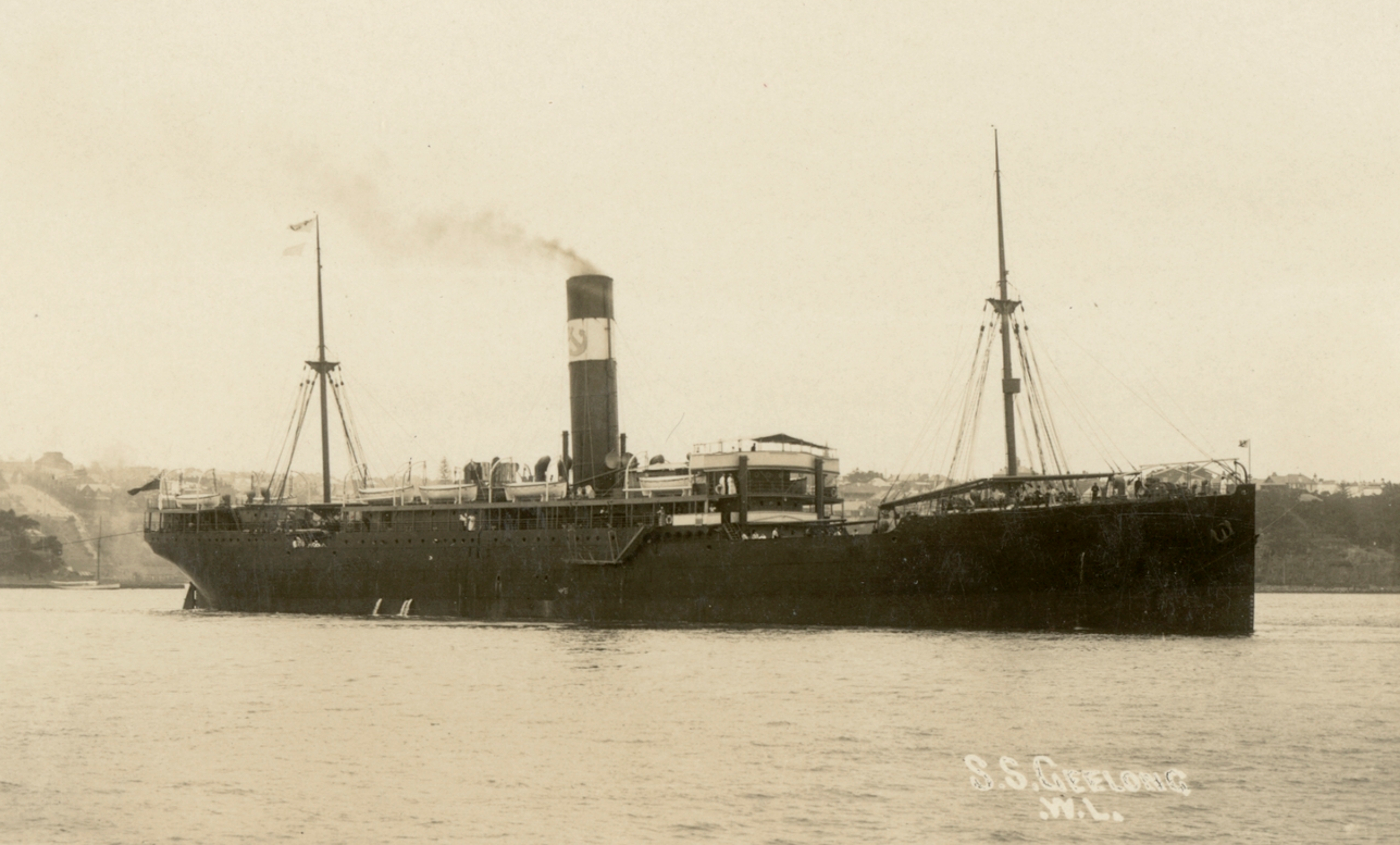
- Geelong

History

United Kingdom
- Name: Geelong
- Owner: W, FW, & AE Lund
- Operator: Blue Anchor Line 1904–1910; P&O 1911–1916
- Port of registry: London
- Route: London – Durban – Adelaide
- Builder: Barclay, Curle & Co, Glasgow
- Yard number: 444
- Launched: 19 March 1904
- Completed: May 1904
- Identification: UK official number 118426; code letters VQTH
- Fate: Sank after colliding with the stores ship SS Bonvilston, 1 January 1916

General characteristics
- Tonnage: 7,951 GRT; 5,030 NRT
- Length: 450.2 ft (137.2 m)
- Beam: 54.5 ft (16.6 m)
- Depth: 26.9 ft (8.2 m)
- Decks: 1
- Installed power: 2 × triple-expansion engines; 803 NHP
- Propulsion: 2 x screws
- Speed: 14 kn (26 km/h) service speed
- Capacity: 120 × saloon and 200 × 3rd class passengers

Geelong was a ship owned by the Blue Anchor Line, and, after 1910, by P&O. She was built in 1904 by Barclay, Curle and Co. Ltd., at Glasgow, Scotland. As built, she had berths for 120 saloon and 200 third-class passengers, and also carried cargo. Her tonnages were 7,951 GRT and 5,030 NRT) tons, and she was 450.0 feet (137.2 metres) long, powered by triple-expansion steam engines, and capable of 14 knots, with a cruising speed of 12 knots (22 km/h).

In August 1909, Geelong took part in a search for the Blue Anchor liner Waratah, which disappeared without trace off the South African coast, and was thought to be disabled and drifting.

In World War I, the Government of Australia chartered Geelong as a troopship to transport the Australian Imperial Force to the Middle East and Europe. Designated HMAT A2 Geelong, the ship departed on her first voyage as a troopship on 22 September 1914, carrying 440 soldiers from Melbourne, Australia, consisting of the Australian Army′s 3rd Field Artillery Brigade, the 3rd Field Company Engineers, and some members of the 12th Infantry Battalion. She proceeded to Hobart, Australia, where she picked up another 912 soldiers, consisting of the 12th Infantry Battalion and the 3rd Light Horse Regiment. She left Hobart, bound for Egypt, on 20 October 1914.

Her second outbound trooping voyage left Adelaide, Australia, on 31 May 1915, transporting 1,264 soldiers of the 27th Infantry Battalion and the 7th Field Ambulance unit. She also picked up another 252 soldiers, who were reinforcements for various other units, from Fremantle, Australia, on 7 June 1915.

Her final departure from Australia was on 18 November 1915, carrying 1,362 soldiers, including the 32nd Infantry Battalion and some reinforcements for other units. Shortly after disembarking the men in Egypt, Geelong sank after a collision with Bonvilston, an Admiralty stores ship, in the Mediterranean Sea near Alexandria, Egypt, on 1 January 1916. There was no loss of life.
