= USAT Burnside =

U.S. Army cable ship

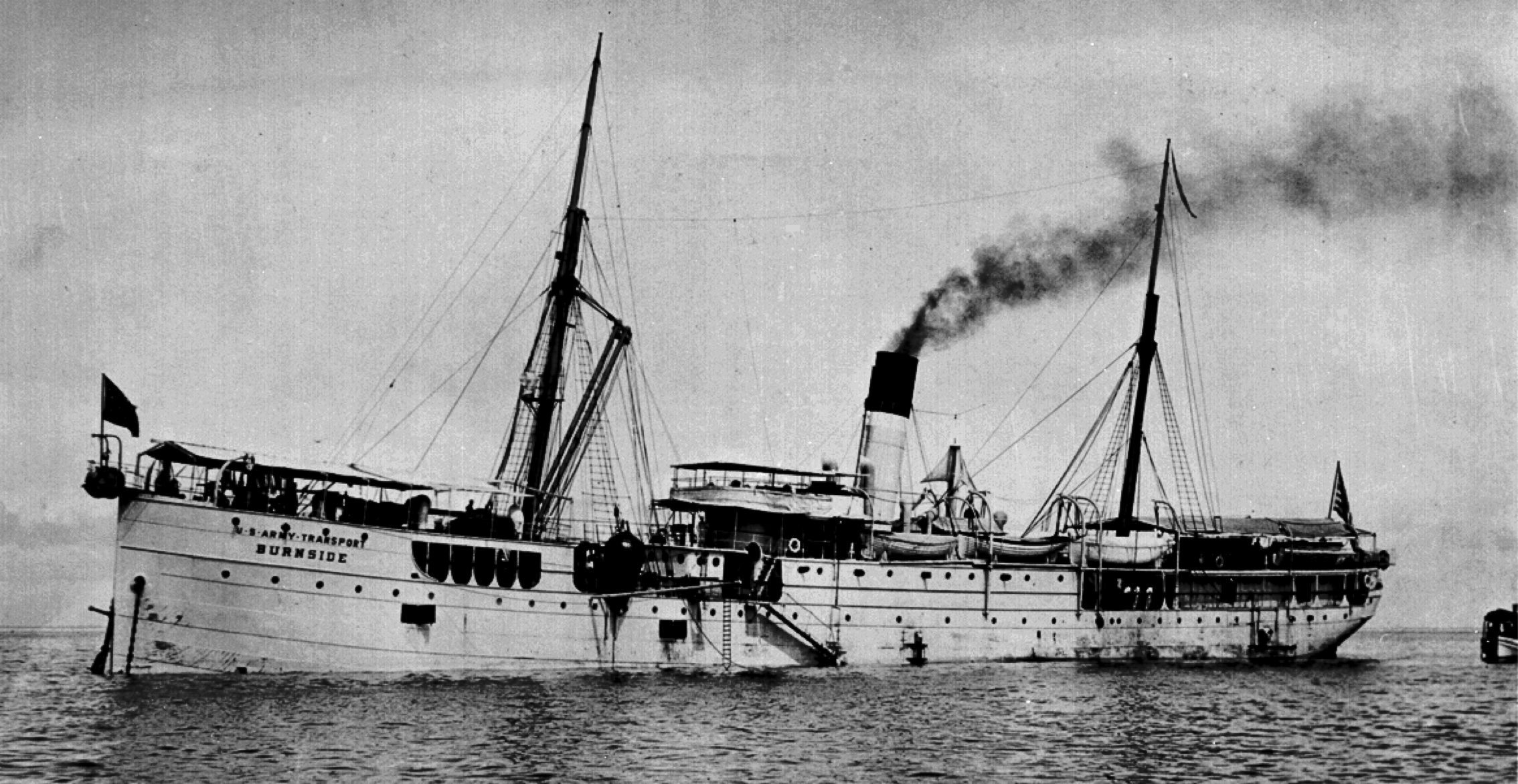
- USAT Burnside

History

United Kingdom
- Name: Yeoman (1882-1891)
- Operator: Blue Anchor Line
- Builder: Campbell, Macintosh, Bowstead
- Launched: 25 March 1882
- Home port: London, England
- Identification: Official number 85149; Signal letters WKQL
- Fate: Sold

Spain
- Name: Rita (1891-1898)
- Operator: Linea de Vapores Serra
- Home port: Bilbao
- Fate: Captured by USS Yale

United States
- Name: Rita (1898-1899); Burnside (1899-1924)
- Operator: Army Transport Service
- Home port: Seattle
- Identification: Call sign: BS (1909), WXR (1913)
- Fate: Sold and scrapped in 1924

General characteristics
- Tonnage: 2,226 Gross registered tons; 1,427 Net registered tons
- Length: 285.2 ft (86.9 m)
- Beam: 36.7 ft (11.2 m)
- Depth of hold: 23.5 ft (7.2 m)
- Propulsion: 1 triple-expansion steam engine
- Speed: 12 knots

USAT Burnside was the first American cable ship in the Pacific. Between 1900 and 1905 she laid 3,000 miles of submarine cable which connected many parts of the Philippines and Alaska to the rest of the world for the first time in history. She was responsible for maintenance of the Army cables on the Pacific coast of the United States for two decades.

The ship was built in England in 1882 for general freight service between London and Australia. Her initial name was Yeoman. She was sold in 1891 to a Spanish steamship company which renamed her Rita. The ship was at sea when the Spanish-American War was declared and had the bad luck to be taken as a prize by USS Yale in 1898. The US Army purchased her as a transport, and in 1900 converted her into a cable ship named Burnside.

Burnside was replaced by USAT Dellwood in 1923. She was sold and scrapped in 1924.

== Construction and characteristics ==
Yeoman was ordered by Wilhelm Lund for his steamship company, the Blue Anchor Line. She was built by Campbell, Macintosh, and Bowstead at the Scotswood Shipyard in Newcastle, England and launched on 25 March 1882.

Yeoman's hull was built of iron plates. She was 285.2 feet (86.9 m) long, with a beam of 36.7 feet (11.2 m) and a depth of hold of 23.5 feet (7.2 m). Her gross register tonnage was 2,226, and her net register tonnage was 1,427.

Her propeller was originally powered by a coal-fired double-expansion steam engine which was built by T. Clark and Company of Newcastle. It had high, and low-pressure cylinders with diameters of 35 inches, and 68 inches, respectively, with a stroke of 48 inches. The engine was rated at 300 horsepower. This was replaced in 1887 by a triple-expansion engine with cylinders of 25, 38.5 and 63 inches with a stroke of 44 inches. This second engine was built by Wigham Richardson and Company of Newcastle. The more modern engine gave the ship a cruising speed of 12 knots.

Electric lighting and refrigeration were installed on Burnside at the shipyard of Lewis Nixon in Elizabethport, NJ in December 1898 after the ship was taken over by the Army.

She had a 3 kilowatt radio transmitter aboard in 1909, and was assigned the call sign, "BS". In 1913 her call sign was changed to, "WXR".

In 1913 Burnside was taken out of service briefly to have new oil-fired boilers installed.

== Blue Anchor Line (1882–1891) ==
The Blue Anchor Line pioneered regularly scheduled cargo and passenger service between London and Australia. Yeoman sailed this route, via the Suez Canal, stopping for coal and water at several points along her route. She carried as many as 400 immigrants to Australia on a single trip, and general cargo. Her cargo included livestock, musical instruments, china, furniture, stationary, cutlery, dolls, toys, purses, vases, and more. She made port calls in Adelaide, Fremantle, Albany, Hobart, Launceston, and Sydney.

== Linea de Vapores Serra (1891–1898) ==
Sometime in 1891 Lund sold Yeoman to a Spanish steamship company, Linea de Vapores Serra. Her name was changed to Rita, and her homeport became Bilbao.

The ship hauled general cargos between ports in North America across the Atlantic to Europe. North American port calls include Boston, Galveston, Norfolk, Pensacola, Puerto Rico, and St John. European port calls included Liverpool, and Havre.

In October 1892 Rita caught fire outside of Galveston while bound for Liverpool. The fire was extinguished, but 123 bales of cotton were damaged.

== US Army service (1898–1924) ==
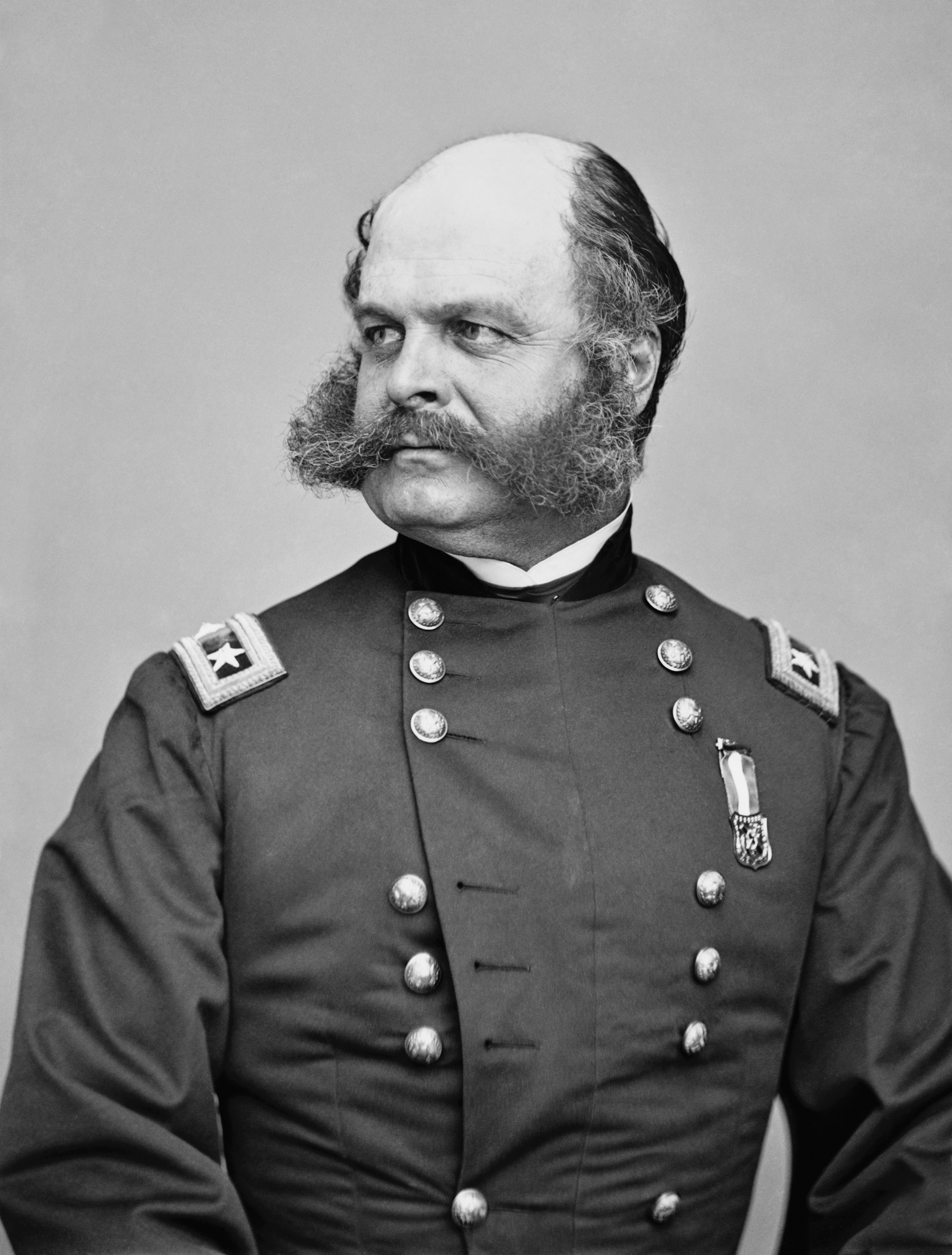
General Ambrose Burnside, Burnside's namesake

=== Spanish-American War (1898–1900) ===
On 25 April 1898, Congress declared war on Spain, beginning the Spanish-American War. An immediate objective was to defeat Spain in the Caribbean, taking Cuba and Puerto Rico. The US Navy began patrolling off the islands. On 8 May 1898 Rita was sailing from Liverpool to Puerto Rico with a cargo of coal when she encountered USS Yale off Culebra Island. A chase ensued, but Yale was somewhat faster, and armed with 6-inch guns. Several warning shots were fired which Rita ignored, but when a shell exploded over the head of her captain, the ship was surrendered. A nine-man prize crew, under the command of Yale's first officer, W. B. Porter, took her in to Charleston, South Carolina.

Rita was purchased by the US Army Quartermaster's Department from the U.S. Prize Court on 9 July 1898 for $125,000 and assigned to the Army Transport Service. The Army reckoned her capacity at 15 officers and 700 men. The day after her purchase she began her new career as a troop transport.

On 10 July 1898 Rita sailed for Cuba with reinforcements for the American campaign. She was filled to capacity with the 2nd and 3rd battalions of the 6th Illinois Volunteer Infantry Regiment, less Companies D and M. She sailed from Tampa to Ponce, Puerto Rico on 27 July 1898. Over the next two years the ship made numerous trips between the American mainland, Cuba, and Puerto Rico laden with personnel, food, medical supplies, and other equipment for the Army.

To mark her transition to military service, the ship was renamed in February 1899. Rita became United States Army Transport Burnside, named for Civil War General Ambrose Burnside.

Prior to the Spanish-American War there was a Cuban revolutionary army on the island seeking independence from Spain. This army assisted American forces to defeat the Spanish. Spain's ceding of Cuba to the United States did not address the fate of the 30,000 revolutionary soldiers still in the field and owed substantial back pay. Seeking to buy peace on the island, the United States offered to pay each Cuban soldier $100 in return for the orderly disbanding of this Cuban Army. Burnside found herself with $3 million in cash aboard, including 2,500,000 dimes and 200,000 nickels, anchored in Havana harbor on 18 March 1899. Cuban officials sought more money for their soldiers, so Burnside sat at anchor while negotiations continued. On 4 April 1899 the Cuban Military Assembly voted to disband the Cuban Army. Burnside circumnavigated the island with two Army paymasters aboard to distribute the funds.

=== Cable ship in the Philippines (1900–1904) ===
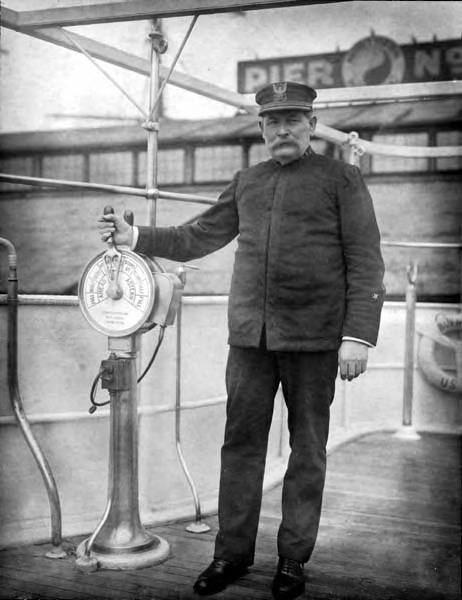
Alfred H. Laffin, Burnside's captain from 1898 to 1912 at the ship's engine room telegraph

When Commodore Dewey defeated the Spanish fleet in Manila Bay on 1 May 1898, there were two undersea cables which landed in Manila. One provided telegraph communication from the Philippines to the rest of the world via Hong Kong, and the other connected the city to major islands of the archipelago. Both belonged to the British firm Eastern Extension, Australasia, and China Telegraph Company (Limited). The day after his victory, Dewey approached the British Consul in Manila to arrange for American use of the telegraph service. The Spanish, who still controlled Manila, refused to allow the Americans to send telegrams. Dewey replied by cutting the cables in Manila Bay. The link to Hong Kong was cut on 2 May 1898, and Capiz on 23 May 1898, isolating Luzon from the rest of the world.

Undersea cables became a military priority for the Army commanders in the Philippines. While the British cables were ultimately repaired, they did not reach all the major islands. General Otis, and General MacArthur complained of communication difficulties. The Army in the Philippines was dependent on slow, ship-borne mail for communications to many locations. To build its own inter-island telegraph system, the Army sent the cable ship USAT Hooker to Manila. She was wrecked on Corregidor in August 1899 before she was able to commence her work. Much of Hooker's cable laying machinery and testing equipment was salvaged, and was installed on Burnside when she arrived in Manila.

On 30 June 1900, the Army contracted with the Morse Iron Works shipyard in Brooklyn, New York to convert Burnside into a cable ship. The reported cost of this conversion was $130,000. Burnside was chosen as Hooker's replacement because of her relatively shallow draft for her size. Three large copper tanks were built in her cargo holds in which submarine cable could be coiled. The tanks were 25 feet (7.6 m) in diameter and 15 feet (4.6 m) deep. Each had an iron core at its center to hold the cable in position while it was unspooled. Each tank had capacity to hold 250 miles of cable.

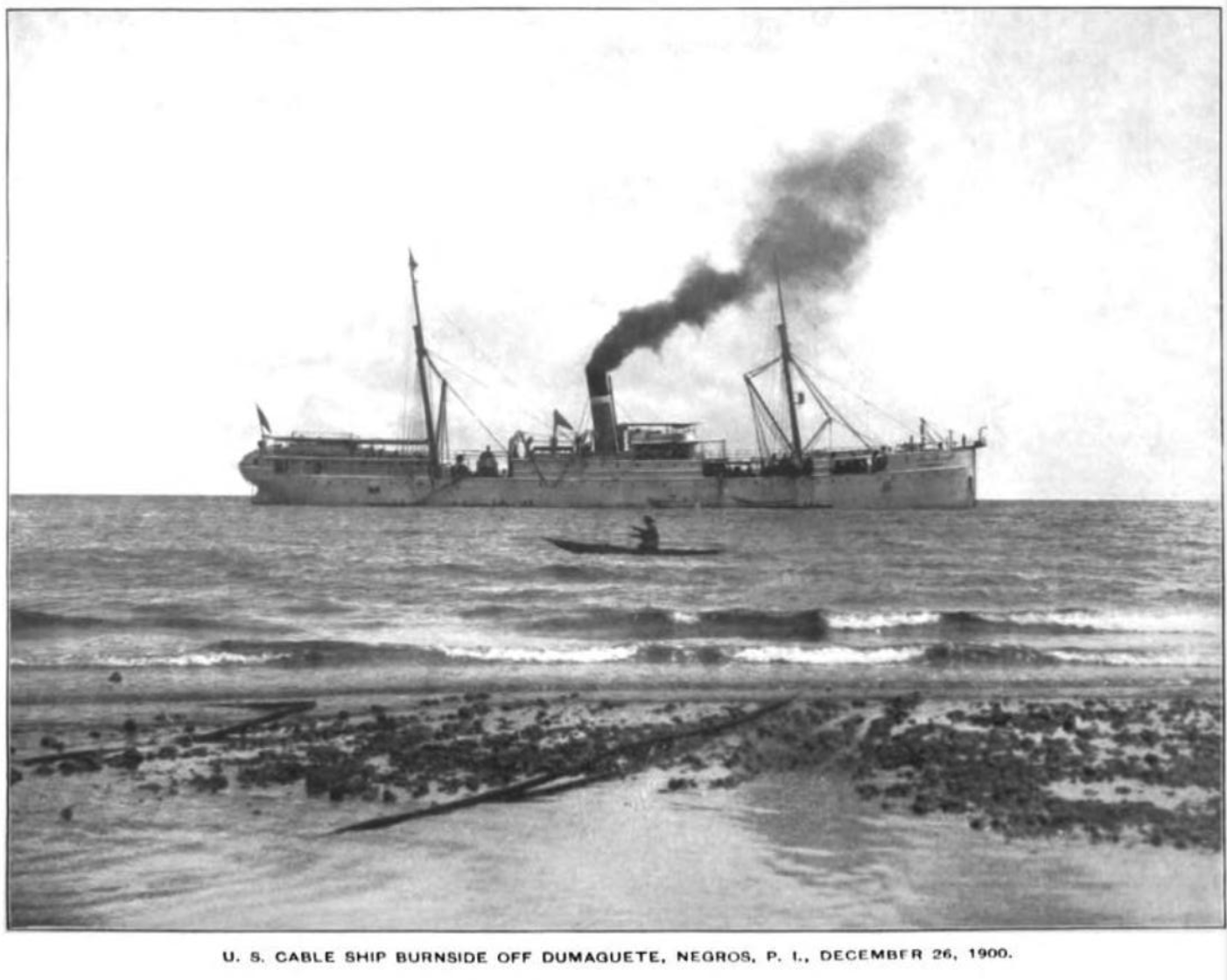
Burnside off Dumaguete, December 1900

Burnside departed New York on 26 September 1900 with 553 miles of deep-sea cable and 8 miles of the thicker, more heavily-armored shore-end cable aboard. She had on board a crew of 104 men to run the ship, and a 25-man Signal Corps detachment led by Captain George O. Squier who were in charge of laying the cable. As she was sailing into a war zone, she was armed with three 6-pounder and four 1-pounder rapid-fire guns.

Burnside reached Gibraltar on 10 October 1900. She stopped at Malta, Port Said, Aden, Colombo, and Singapore, before arriving in Manila on 7 December 1900. She sailed from Manila on 23 December 1900 to begin laying cable. The first segment connected Dumaguete on Negros Island to Misamis on Mindanao, approximately 100 miles away. In the first six months of 1901, Burnside completed seven cables which were, in aggregate, 447 nautical miles long. Between July and November 1901 she laid another 14 cables of 607 miles and repaired 13 cables. While in the Philippines, she was not employed continuously as a cable ship, but spent part of her time as a transport.

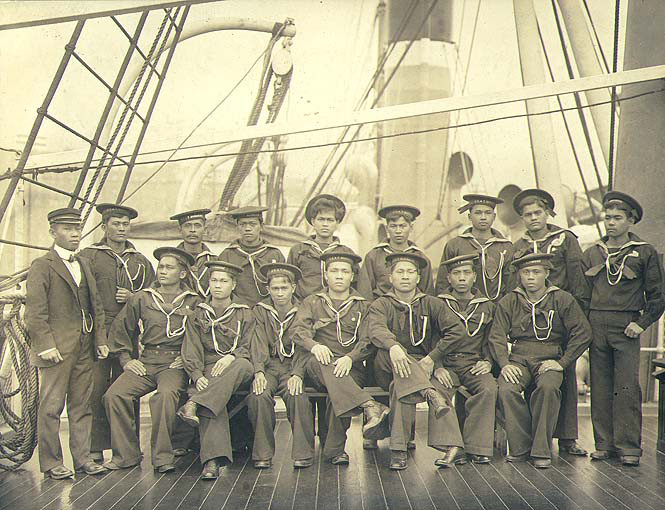
Filipino crewmen aboard Burnside

A notable aspect of the Burnside's operations was the large number of Filipino crew. Her job in the Philippines was not merely to lay submarine cable, but to trench the cable ashore, build cable offices, and do whatever else was required on land and sea to make the links work in wilderness locations. The ship needed more manpower, so the bosun went ashore in Manila to hire whoever he could. These men stuck with the ship and gained cable-laying skills. There were 116 Filipino crew aboard in 1904 when the ship came to Seattle. They were highly regarded by their officers, but were paid roughly two-thirds of what the Army would pay a white crew. Filipino crew worked on Burnside until at least 1912 despite the fact that the ship left the islands in 1904.

=== Laying the Alaska cable (1903–1905) ===
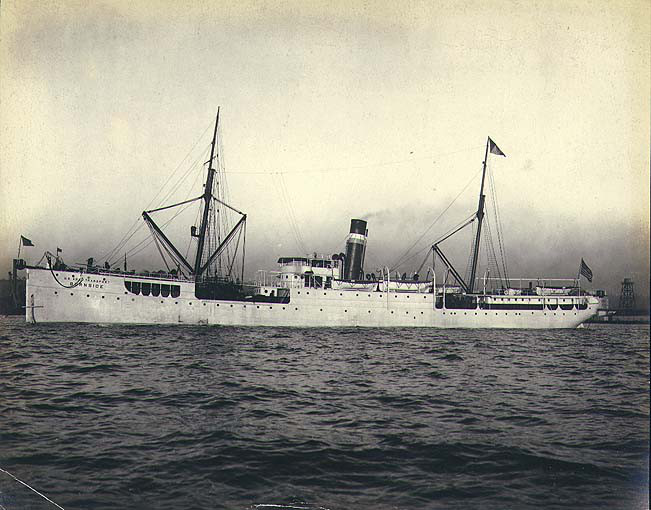
Burnside at anchor in Puget Sound

In the wake of the discovery of gold in the Klondike and at Nome, in May 1900 Congress appropriated $455,550 to build a telegraph cable from St. Michael to the rest of the military network in Alaska. Since Burnside was the only American cable ship in the Pacific, and fully engaged in the Philippines, little could be done immediately. Congress extended the availability of these funds through the 1903 fiscal year. A further $485,000 was voted to connect the Alaska network with continental America. Congress approved $321,580 in April 1904 for a cable between Valdez and Sitka, and another $95,000 in March 1905 for a cable between Valdez and Seward. Burnside laid all of these cables.

In March 1903 Burnside sailed to Hong Kong for shipyard maintenance prior to crossing the Pacific. She departed Manila on 8 June 1903, made a coaling stop in Nagasaki, and reached Juneau on 11 July 1903. She laid a 17-mile-long cable connecting Skagway and Haines, and repaired the existing cable between Juneau and Skagway. Burnside then sailed south to Seattle surveying the proposed route of the cable to Alaska. She arrived in Seattle on 4 August 1903.

The contract for 1,200 miles of cable for the Alaska project was awarded to the Safety Insulated Wire and Cable Company of Bayonne, New Jersey on 7 March 1903. It was the longest submarine cable manufactured in the United States at the time. The cable was shipped from New York to Puget Sound via Cape Horn in two sections. The first 580 miles shipped in June 1903 aboard the American-Hawaiian Line steamer Texan. She arrived in Seattle on 1 September 1903. This cable was loaded aboard Burnside by the morning of 15 September.

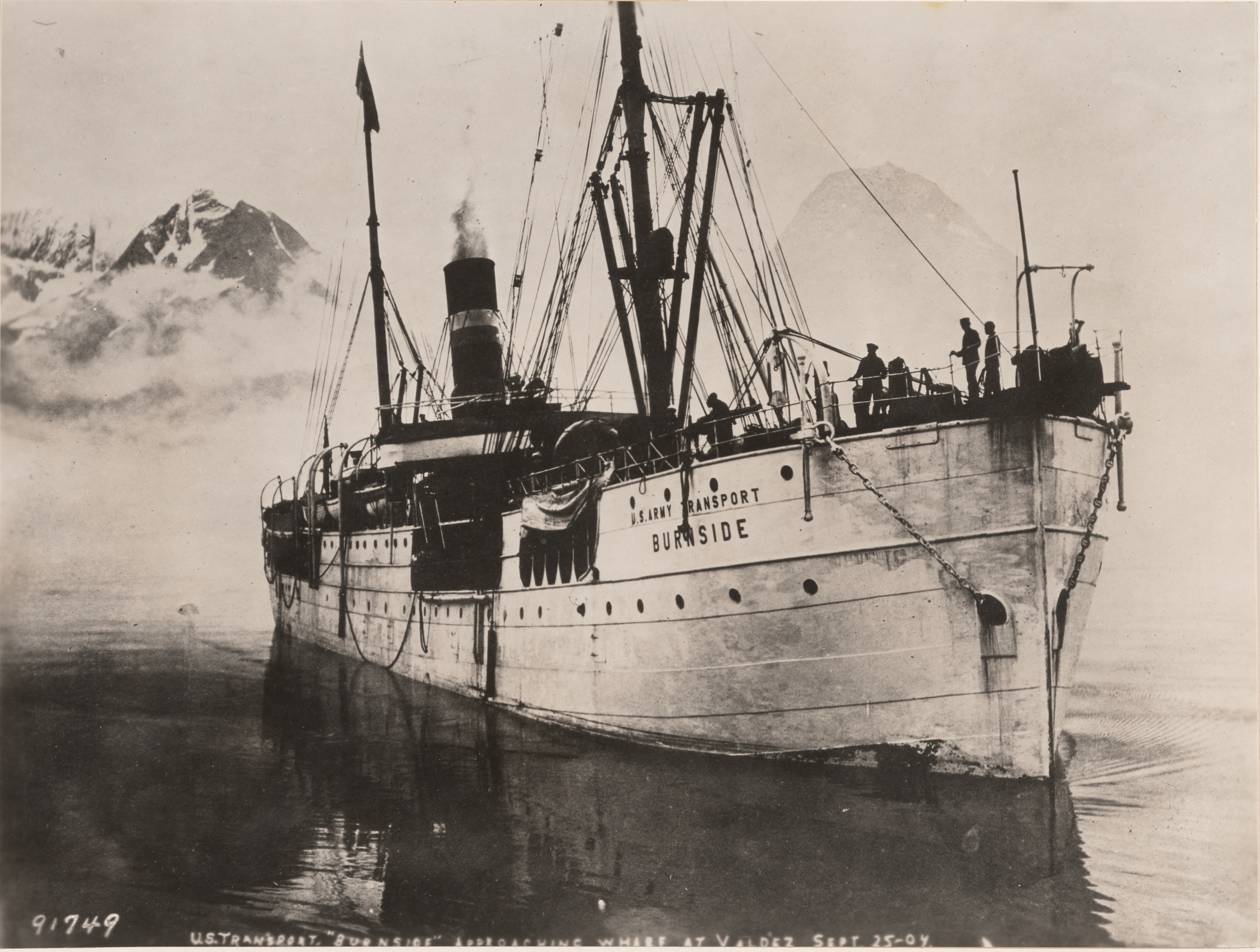
Burnside arriving in Valdez to begin cable laying, September 1904

On 16 September 1903, Burnside sailed for Juneau. She had aboard the Chief Signal Officer of the United States Army, Brigadier General Adolphus Greely, who supervised the laying of the cable. The trip began on a sour note when Burnside hit an iceberg off Admiralty Island and sustained damage to her hull. She arrived at Juneau on 22 September 1903. After making quick repairs to the ship, the cable from Juneau to Sitka, 291 miles long, was completed on 2 October 1903. Due to the lateness of the season, the days were getting shorter and the weather stormier. Burnside laid cable from Sitka about 130 miles south before the need for repairs, and bad weather sent her back to Seattle. The end of the cable was buoyed so work on the Sitka-Seattle route could resume in 1904.

During the winter of 1903-04, Burnside was sent back to the Philippines where a number of outages had occurred in the telegraph cables laid by the ship in 1901. In areas of high current, cables were sawn apart by movement over rough, coral-encrusted seabeds. She left Seattle for Manila on 1 January 1904, carrying 200 tons of oats and 200 tons of hay. She stopped for coal in Honolulu on 12 January 1904. After 48 days of cable maintenance in the Philippines, on 6 April 1904 Burnside sailed from Manila for Seattle, where she arrived on 18 May 1904.

The second part of the Alaska cable, 780 miles, arrived at Seattle from New York on the American-Hawaiian Line steamship American in November 1903, too late to be used that year. It was stored in Tacoma. Other, shorter sections arrived from New York in forty freight cars. On her return from the Philippines, Burnside began loading cable aboard on 9 June 1904 and finally sailed north to Alaska on 19 June 1904. Numerous difficulties were encountered. The buoy that marked the end of the cable in October 1903 had been washed away in winter storms, forcing the crew to grapple for the wire in 9,000 feet (2,700 m) of water. Some of Burnside's cable laying machinery broke down, and the weather was stormy. Nonetheless, the cable from Sitka to Seattle, 1,070 miles long, was completed on 28 August 1904. The final splice took place at a ceremony in Elliot Bay which was attended by several hundred people. To commemorate the event, Mayor Richard A. Ballinger of Seattle and Mayor Keller of Skagway telegraphed greetings to each other.

Burnside began laying the Valdez to Sitka link on 29 September and completed her work on 5 October 1904. She completed the final link in the submarine cable system between Valdez and Seward on 3 August 1905.

=== Maintaining Pacific Northwest cables (1905–1922) ===
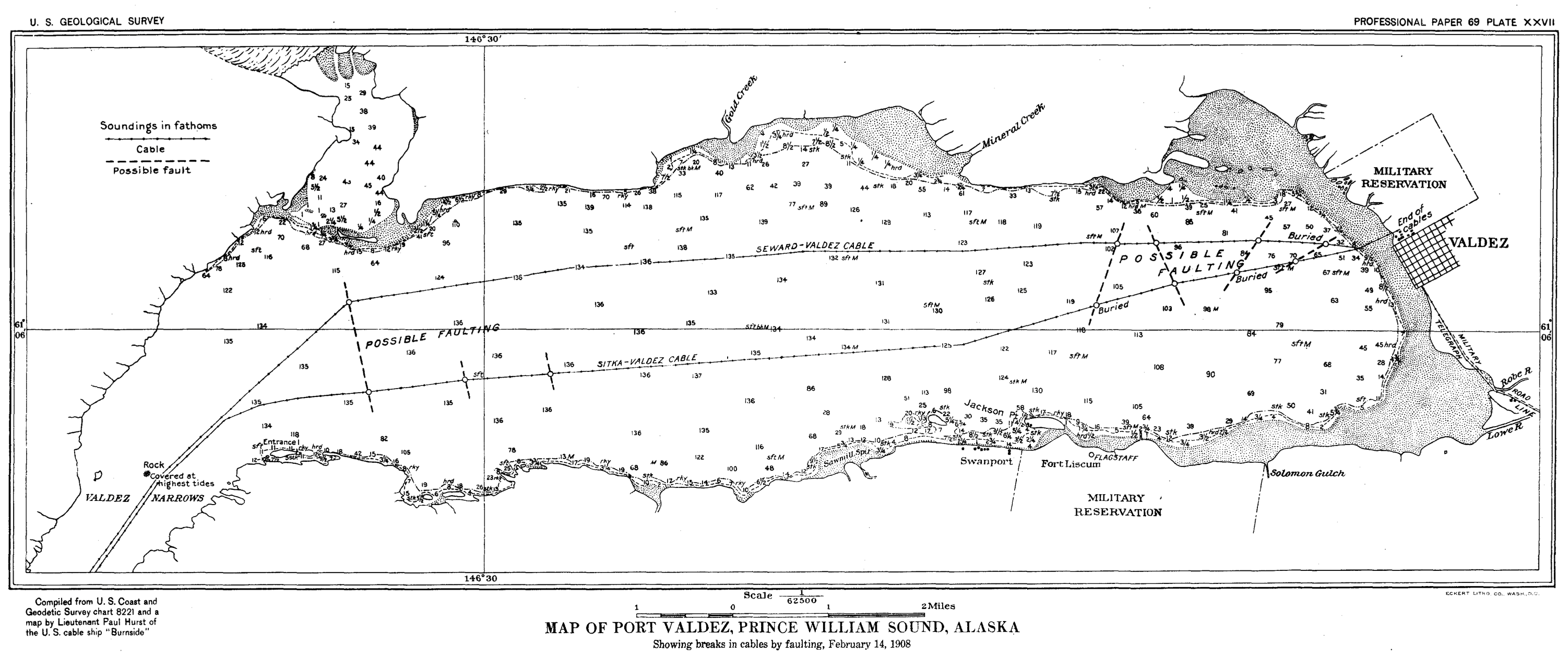
Cable breaks at Valdez from the 1908 earthquake, as charted aboard Burnside

In addition to the Alaska cable system, the Army maintained a number of short cables between coastal defense installations. In Puget Sound, Fort Casey, Fort Flagler, and Fort Worden were connected by fire-control cables. In the Bay Area, there were cables between the Presidio, Fort Baker, Fort Barry, and Fort McDowell. At the mouth of the Columbia, Army cables connected Fort Stevens and Fort Columbia. Burnside was involved in maintaining all of these cables.

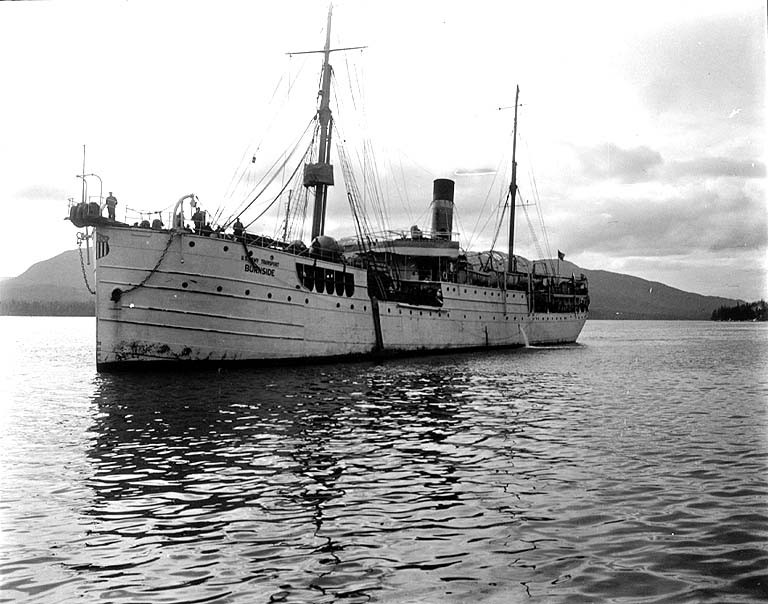
Burnside at Ketchikan, Alaska in 1911

The sea bed is a hostile environment and there were many interruptions in the cables Burnside maintained. In 1905 a whale tangled the Sitka-Valdez cable in its jaws. As it thrashed to free itself, it broke the cable. The drowned corpse was still tangled in the cable when Burnside arrived to fix the line weeks later. A February 1908 earthquake broke the two cables to Valdez in 11 places as the seabed faulted. Ships' anchors ripped cables from harbor bottoms. The ship was continuously busy. In fiscal year 1915, for example, Burnside made five round-trips from Seattle to Alaska to fix nine breaks.

Even though most of her efforts were for maintenance, Burnside did lay additional cable to extend the system, and to replace outdated lines. Notably, at the end of 1906 new cable was laid to connect Wrangell, Hadley, and Ketchikan to the outside world. In 1909 she laid submarine cable to Cordova.

The most serious accident in the ship's career occurred on 21 November 1904. Burnside was on her way north to fix a cable break between Valdez and Sitka. While passing through Seymour Narrows at one-quarter speed, she lost steerage way in the current and was thrown sideways onto Ripple Rock. At the time of the accident the ship was under the command of pilot O. H. Johansen. Later examination in dry dock revealed that 51 feet (16 m) of her keel was torn away and there was a gash 8 feet (2.4 m) wide and 21 feet (6.4 m) long in her port quarter. This enormous hole would likely have sunk the ship but for the fact that it opened a ballast tank which was already filled with water. Burnside continued north to Alert Bay where a quick inspection of the damage was made. The decision was made to return to Seattle for repairs. After an Army investigation of the accident, Captain Laffin was temporarily relieved of his command in January 1905 for being absent from the bridge at the time of the accident. The contract to repair the ship was won by Heffernan Engine Works which bid $31,482 for the work.

In October 1911, the Alaska Steamship Company's Edith went aground on Level Island in Sumner Strait, heavily laden with 60,000 cases of canned salmon. Burnside was able to pull her off undamaged, and Edith was able to continue her voyage under her own steam.

== Obsolescence, sale, and scrapping ==
As the 1920's began, the cables that Burnside had laid in Alaska fifteen years earlier were wearing out. The wear and tear of currents scraping cable along the bottom was compounded by concern that the seamless rubber insulation used by the Safety Insulated Wire and Cable Company was inferior to the gutta-percha insulation used by British cable manufacturers. The Signal Corps planned to replace the original cables, and planned to do it with a more modern ship than the 40-year old Burnside. On 26 September 1921, the steamer Dellwood was transferred from the US Shipping Board to the War Department by Executive Order 3553. Dellwood was a design 1043 freighter built in 1919 for the Emergency Fleet Corporation. Todd Drydocks, Inc. was awarded the contract to convert the freighter into a cable ship in July 1922. By February 1923, Dellwood was in Seattle, and cable laying equipment was moved from Burnside to her replacement.

Burnside was transferred to the US Shipping Board which sold her for $7,600. The ship was bought by General Metal and Supply Company of Oakland in April 1924. Burnside was towed from Seattle to San Francisco Bay in July 1924. In November 1924 she was set ablaze off Oakland, to burn away everything but her steel. She was scrapped there for her metal.
