= Blue Anchor Line =

English shipping company

House flag of the Blue Anchor Line

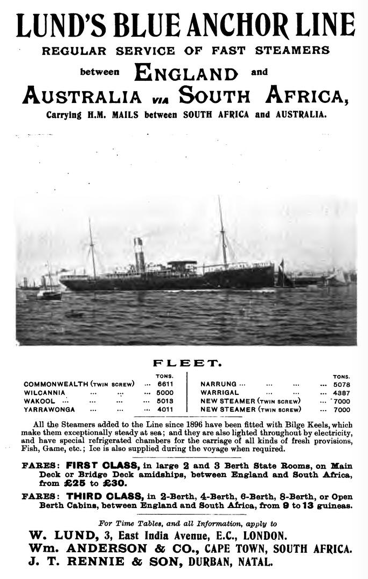
Blue Anchor Line advertisement, 1903

Blue Anchor Line was a British shipping company operating between the United Kingdom, South Africa and Australia between 1870 and 1910.

The owners of this shipping company in later years were Messrs. W. Lund and Sons.

The Blue Anchor Line was founded in London by Wilhelm Lund (born Denmark 1837, died Kent, 1928) in 1869. His two sons were Albert Edward Lund and Friedrich Wilhelm Lund, who was also called Frederick Lund, and is also recorded as F.W. Lund Jr. His grandfather, also a ship-owner, was also called Wilhelm Lund. An "H. Lund" also appears in relation to the business.

Originally sailing ships were used. Between 1880 and 1890, sailing ships were replaced by steamers.

Ships operated by this company include Yeoman, Waratah, Commonwealth, Bungaree, Culgoa, Geelong, Wilcannia, Narrung, and Wakool.

The loss of the Waratah near Durban in 1909 led to the commercial failure of the company. Its ships were sold to P&O, and it was wound up in 1910.

An inquiry was held in London to investigate the disappearance of the Waratah, and FW Lund Jr., who gave evidence at the inquiry on behalf of the owners, was described in some newspaper reports as the chairman of directors of the company, although it appears to have actually been a partnership, in which Wilhelm Lund was still the senior partner.

Waratah's wreck has never been found, and the cause of its loss remains inconclusive and still attracts controversy. Despite this setback, Wilhelm Lund and F.W. Lund continued to be respectable businessmen.

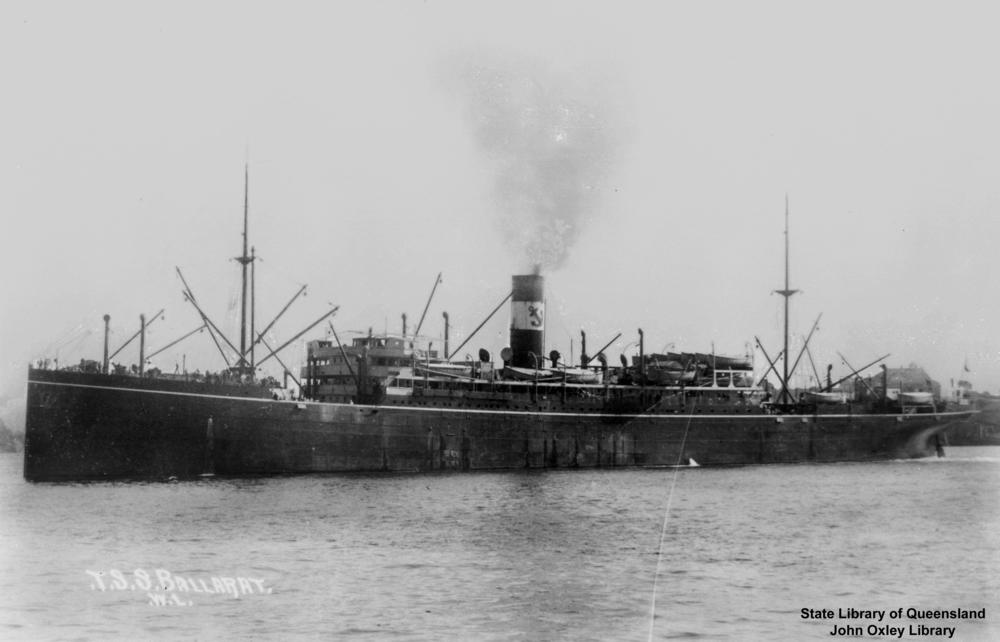
Ballarat (Not owned by the Blue Anchor Line, but painted as a tribute by the P&O Branch Service)

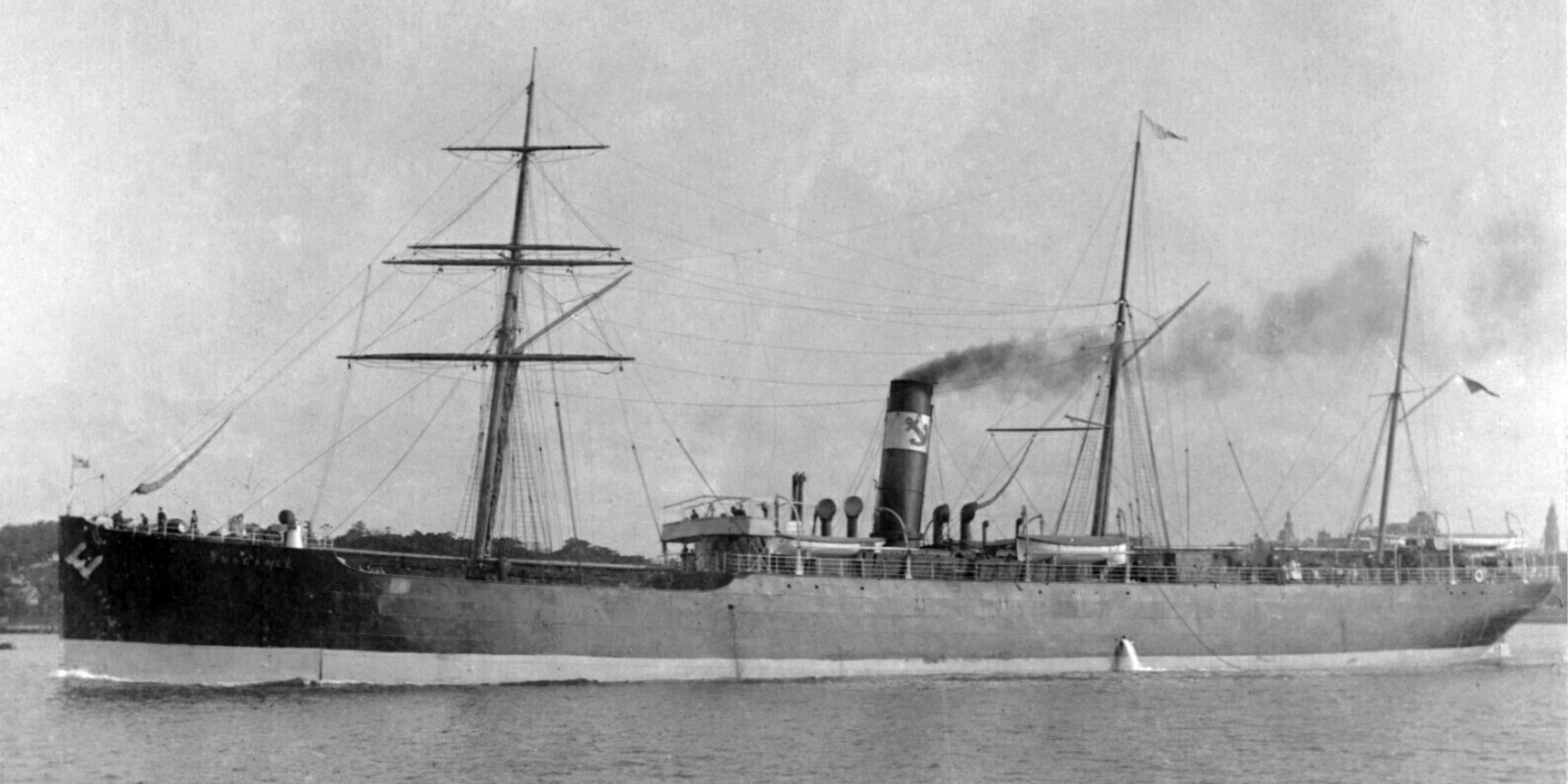
Bungaree

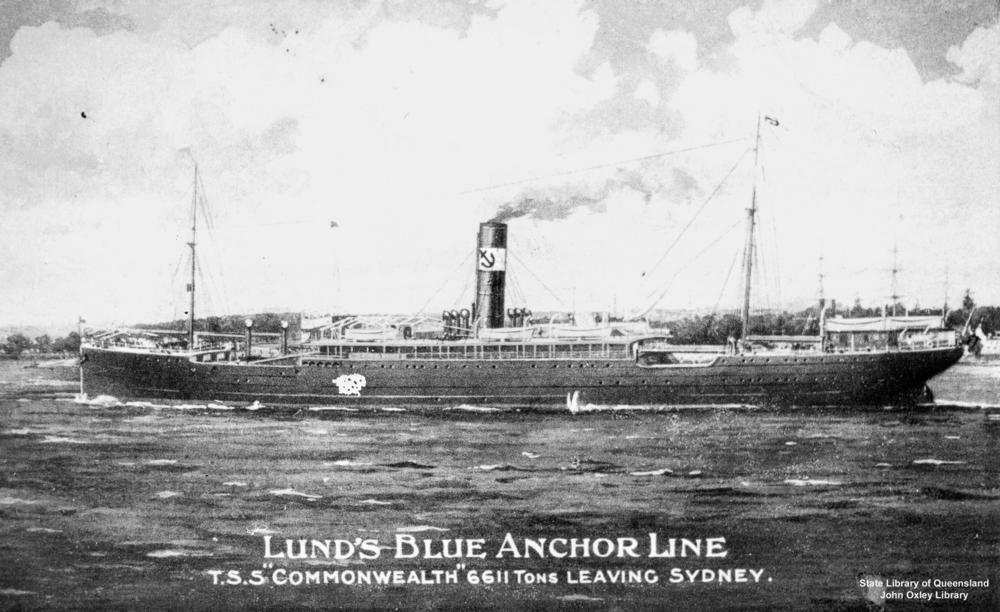
Commonwealth

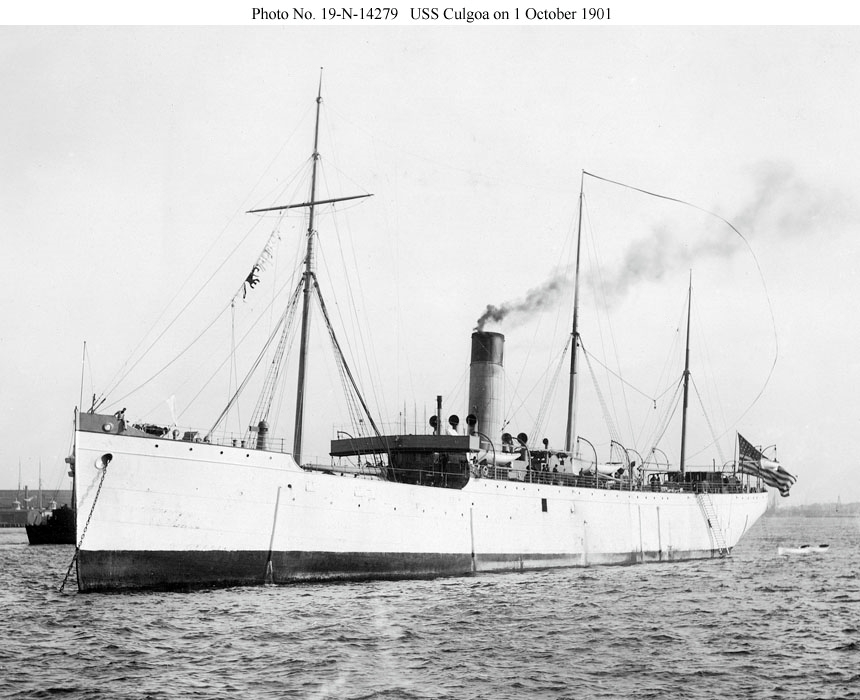
Culgoa

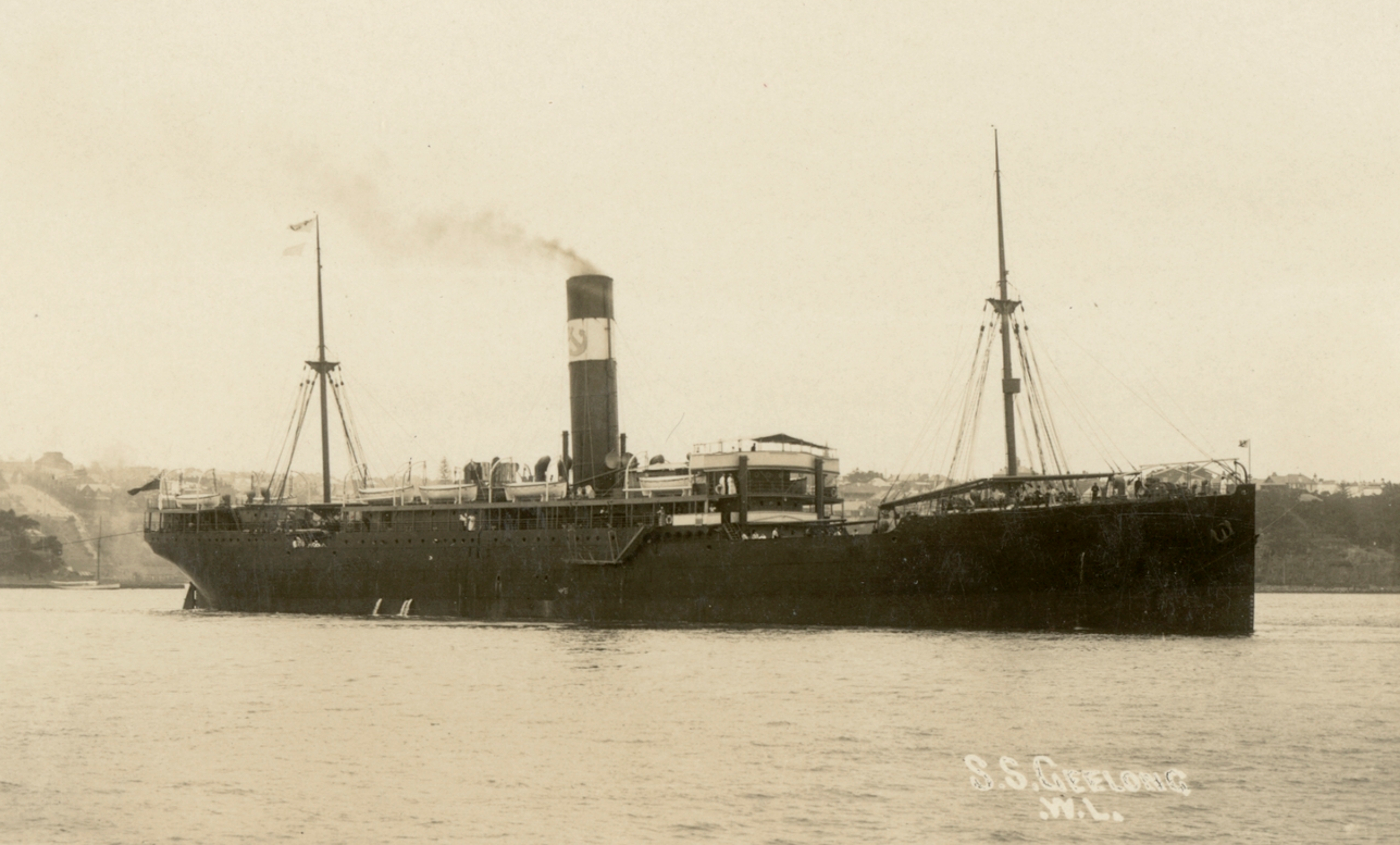
Geelong

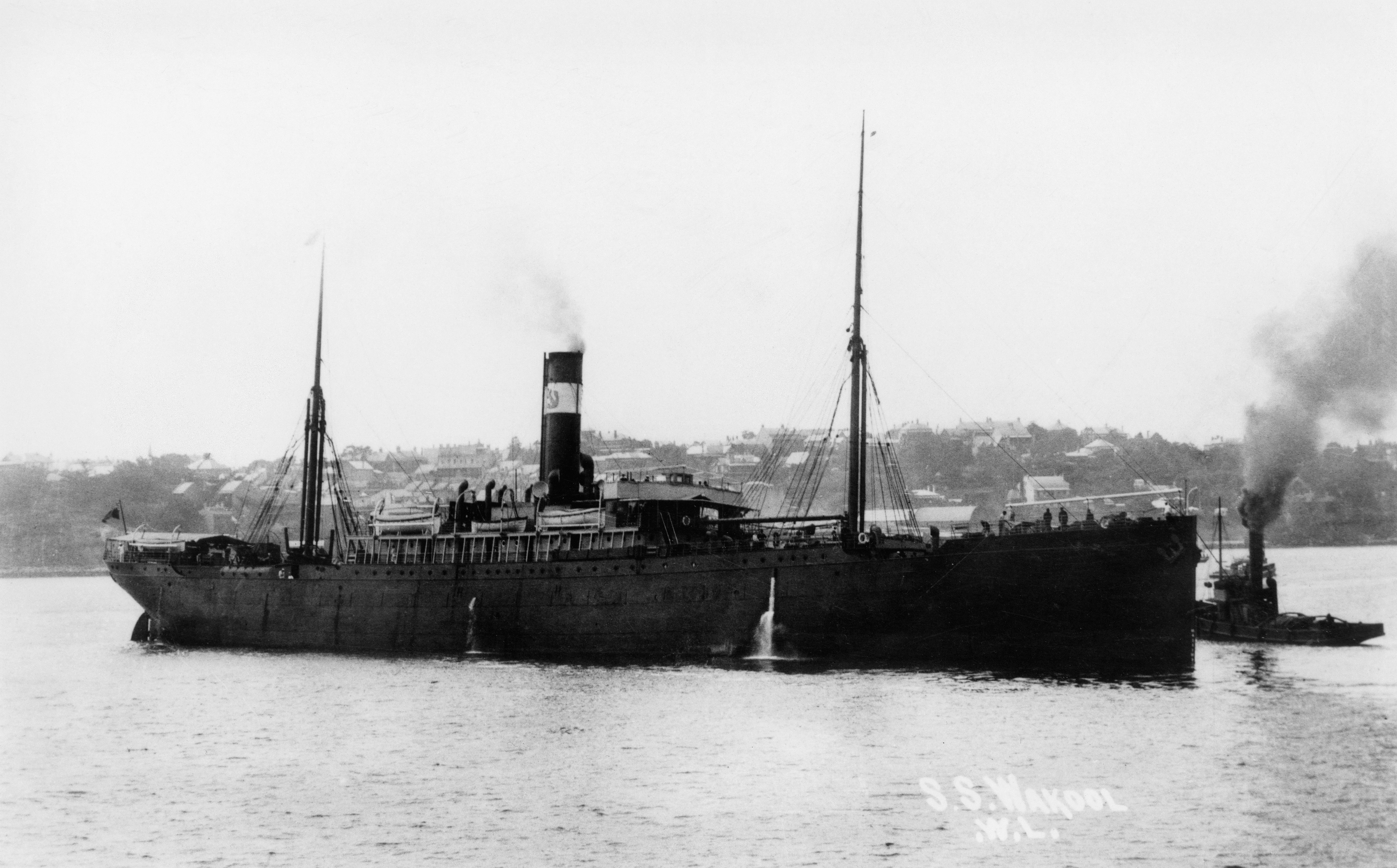
Wakool

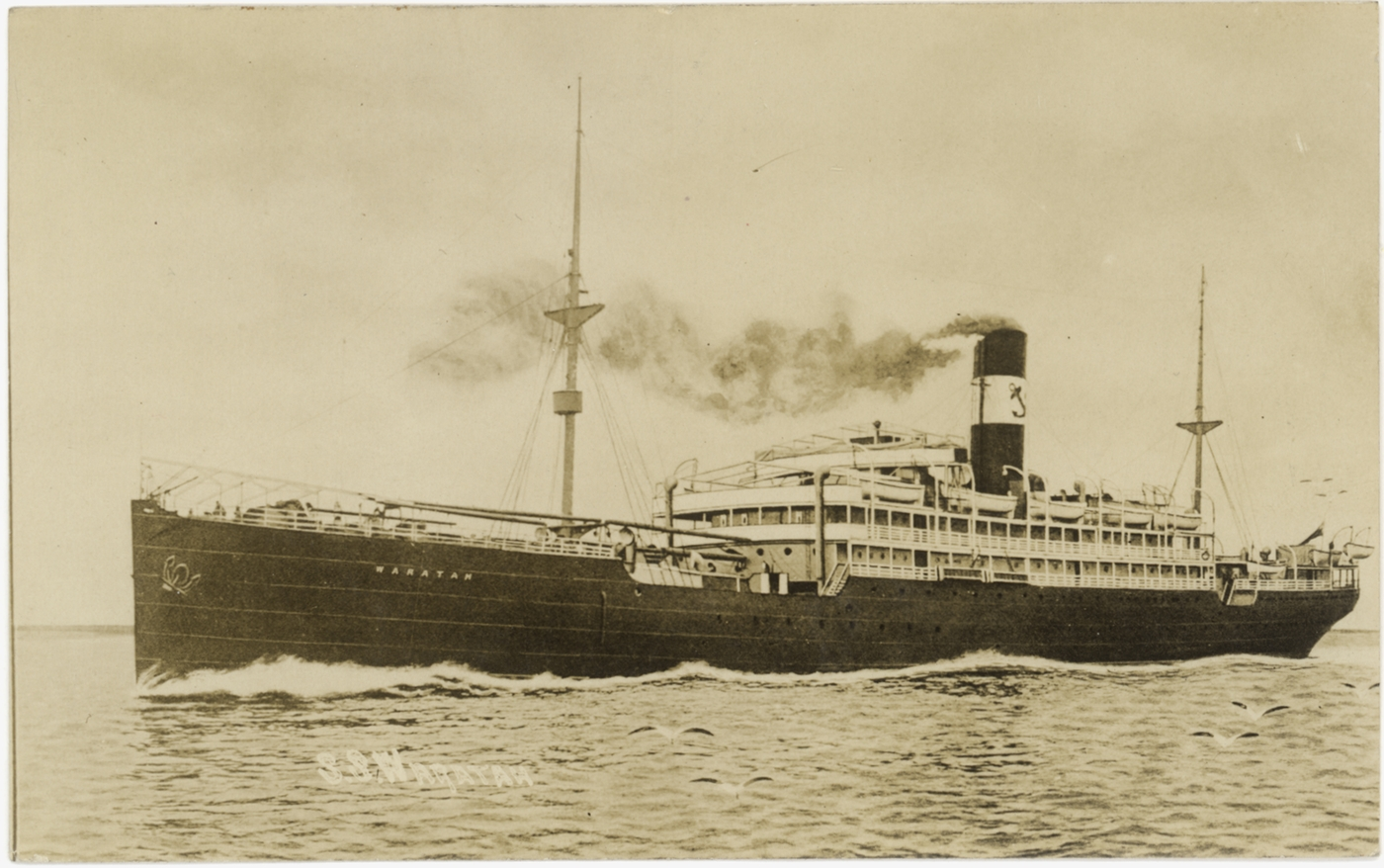
Waratah

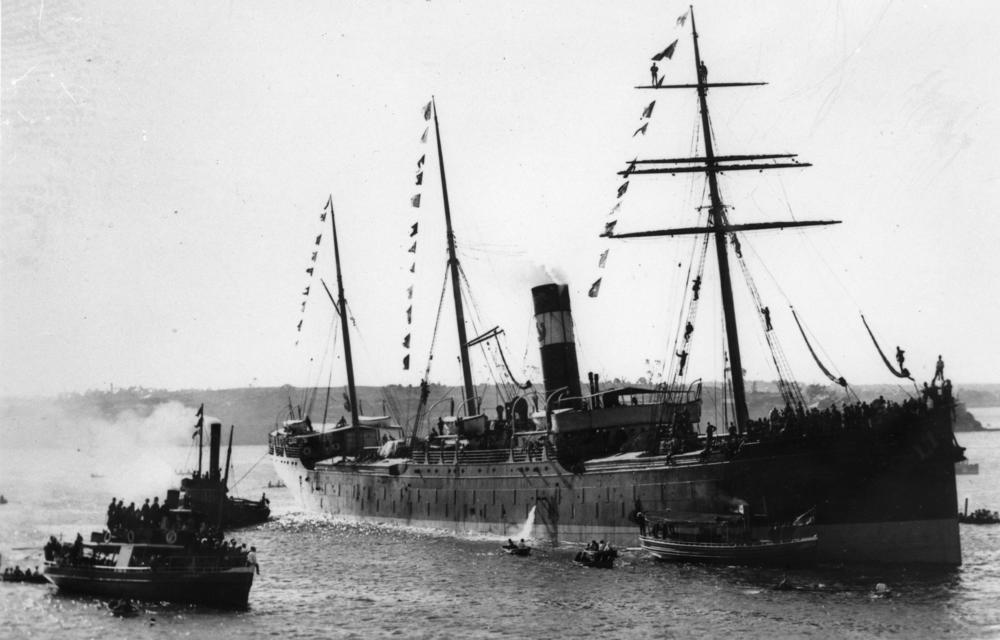
Warrigal

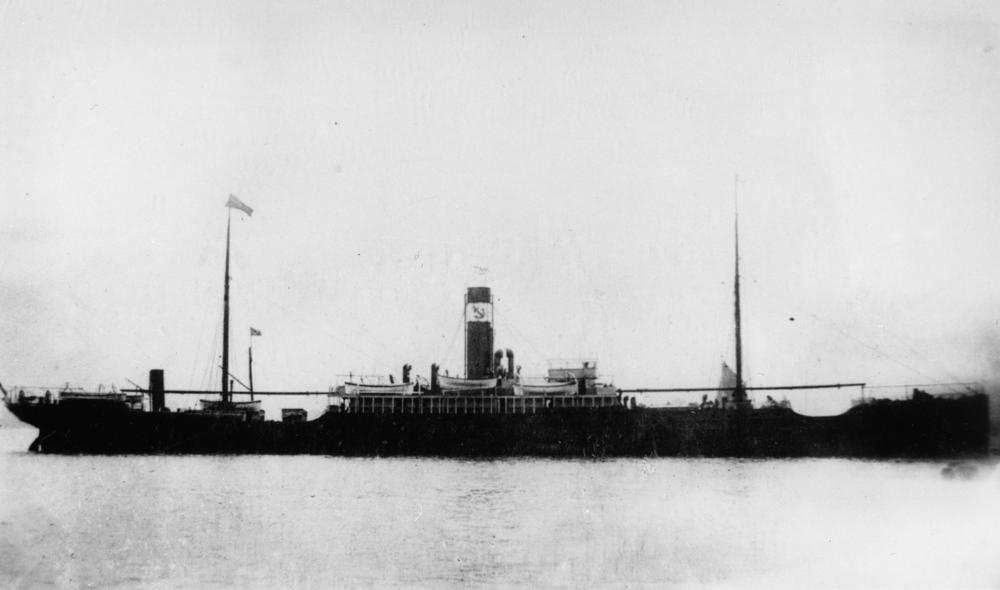
Wilcannia
