= SS San Jacinto (1903) =

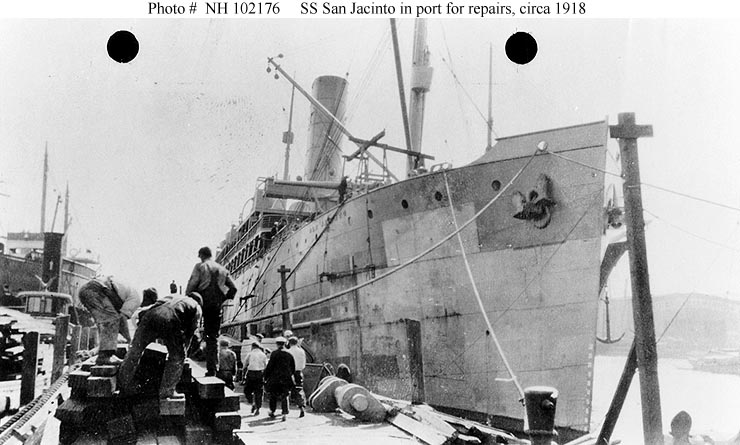
- SS San Jacinto in port. The fresh plating on her bow suggests that she had recently been repaired after her July 1918 collision with the U.S. Navy cargo ship USS Oosterdijk.

History

United States
- Name: SS San Jacinto
- Namesake: San Jacino, California
- Owner: Mallory Line
- Operator: Mallory Line
- Builder: Delaware River Iron Ship Building and Engine Works
- Launched: 22 August 1903
- Completed: 1903
- In service: 1903
- Out of service: 22 April 1942
- Identification: ID-1531 (assigned by Navy but never commissioned)
- Fate: Torpedoed and sunk, 22 April 1942

General characteristics
- Type: Cargo ship
- Tonnage: 6,069 GRT
- Length: 380 ft
- Beam: 53 ft
- Draft: 22 ft
- Propulsion: Steam engine
- Speed: 15 kn
- Crew: 79

SS San Jacinto (ID-2586) was an American commercial passenger-cargo ship chartered by the United States Army for World War I service and considered for acquisition by the United States Navy as USS San Jacinto (ID-1531).

San Jacinto was built by Delaware River Iron Ship Building and Engine Works in 1903 at Chester, Pennsylvania for the Mallory Line. During the period the United States participated in World War I, it served under U.S. Army charter. Although the U.S. Navy considered acquiring San Jacinto and even assigned it the naval registry Identification Number (Id. No.) 1531, the Navy never took control of her, and it remained under Army control through the end of the war.

On either 9 July, 10 July, or 11 July 1918 San Jacinto collided with the U.S. Navy cargo ship USS Oosterdijk in the North Atlantic Ocean. Both ships were seriously damaged and forced to turn about to steam for the nearest port. Despite the efforts of it crew to save it, Oosterdijk had to be abandoned on either 10 July 1918 or 11 July 1918 and sank at 15:30 hours that afternoon. San Jacinto carried Oosterdijk's crew members to Halifax, Nova Scotia, Canada.

San Jacinto was repaired and returned to service under Army charter for the remainder of the war.

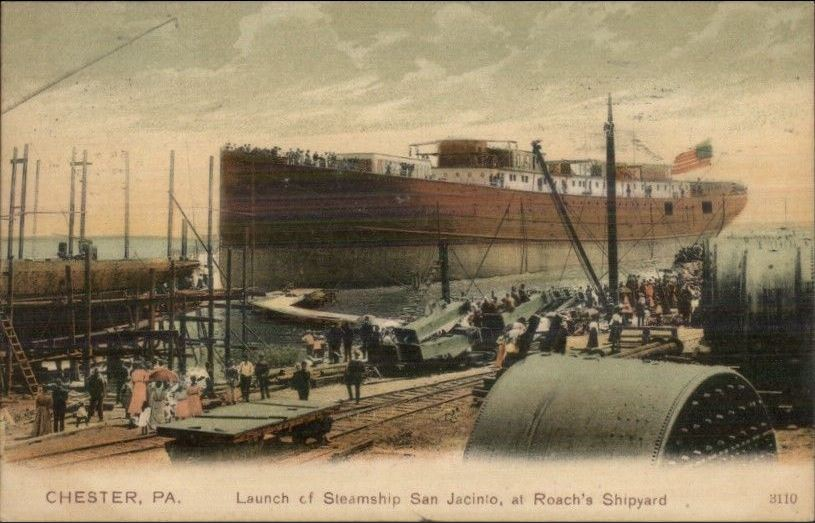
Launch of the steamship San Jacinto at Roach's Shipyard, Chester, Pennsylvania

The original yard-built 27.5-41.5-70 by 42 in 635 nominal horsepower (nhp) engines were replaced by two 23-39-66 by 42 in 564 nhp Hooven-Owens-Rentschler engines at a cost of $100,000 during a general overhaul at Tietjen & Lang, New Jersey in December 1921.

== Sinking ==
On April 21, 1942, the San Jacinto was sighted by the German submarine U-201. On April 22, 1942, after around twelve hours of pursuit, U-201 fired a torpedo that struck the unarmed and unescorted ship at 03.29 hours. Of the eight officers, seventy-one crewmen, and one hundred-four passengers, fourteen were killed. The survivors, including 32 women and children, tied their life-rafts together and waited until daylight to radio for help. They were picked up by USS Rowan (DD-405).
