= USS Oosterdijk =

Dutch cargo ship that served in the United States Navy in 1918

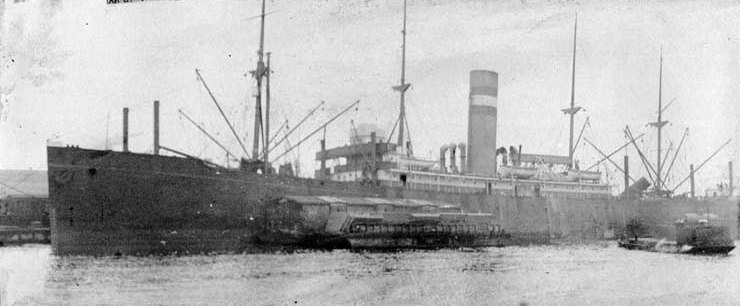
- Oosterdijk in peacetime Holland America Line colours, without neutrality markings

History

Netherlands
- Name: Oosterdijk
- Namesake: Dutch for "East Dyke"
- Owner: 1913: Holland America Line; 1918: NOTS
- Operator: (United States) US Navy (1918)
- Port of registry: (Netherlands) Rotterdam
- Builder: Irvine's Sb & DD, West Hartlepool
- Yard number: 522
- Laid down: 7 June 1912
- Launched: 21 February 1913
- Completed: May 1913
- Acquired: by US Govt, 21 March 1918
- Commissioned: into US Navy, 2 April 1918
- Refit: April 1918
- Identification: code letters PNKL; 1914: call sign PGX; 1918: ID number ID–2586
- Fate: Sank after collision, July 1918

General characteristics
- Type: cargo ship
- Tonnage: 8,250 GRT, 5,226 NRT, 11,927 DWT
- Displacement: 11,900 tons
- Length: 450.4 ft (137.3 m)
- Beam: 55.0 ft (16.8 m)
- Draft: 31 ft 9 in (9.68 m)
- Depth: 38.7 ft (11.8 m)
- Decks: 2 + shelter deck
- Installed power: 755 NHP, 4,600 ihp
- Propulsion: 1 × screw; 1 × quadruple-expansion engine
- Speed: 13 knots (24 km/h)
- Capacity: 610,000 cubic feet (17,000 m^{3}) grain, 568,000 cubic feet (16,100 m^{3}) bale
- Complement: in US Navy, 107
- Notes: sister ship: Westerdijk

USS Oosterdijk was a Holland America Line cargo steamship that was built in 1913 and sank as a result of a collision in 1918. It served in the United States Navy, with the Naval Registry Identification Number ID–2586, from March 1918 until its loss that July. Some sources anglicise its name as Oosterdyk, but Lloyd's Register registered its with the Dutch spelling Oosterdijk.

== Building and identification ==
In 1912 and 1913 Irvine's Shipbuilding & Dry Docks Co Ltd built a pair of sister ships, with consecutive yard numbers, at its shipyard on the River Tees in West Hartlepool, County Durham, England, for the Nederlandsch-Amerikaansche Stoomvaart Maatschappij (NASM), known in English as "Holland America Line". Yard number 522 was laid down on 7 June 1912, launched on 21 February 1913 as Oosterdijk, and completed that May. Yard number 523 was laid down on 14 September 1912, launched on 7 May 1913 as Westerdijk, and completed that July.

Oosterdijk's registered length was 450.4 ft (137.3 m), her beam was 55.0 ft (16.8 m) and her depth was 38.7 ft (11.8 m). Her tonnages were 8,250 GRT, 5,226 NRT and 11,927 DWT. Her holds had capacity for 610,000 cubic feet (17,000 m^{3}) of grain, or 568,000 cubic feet (16,100 m^{3}) of baled cargo.

She had a single screw, driven by a four-cylinder quadruple-expansion steam engine built by Richardsons Westgarth & Company of Hartlepool. It was rated at 755 NHP or 4,600 ihp, and gave her a speed of 13 knots (24 km/h).

NASM registered Oosterdijk at Rotterdam. Her code letters were PNKL. She was equipped for wireless telegraphy. By 1914 her call sign was PGX.

== US Navy service ==
On 20 March 1918 President Woodrow Wilson issued Proclamation 1436, authorising the seizure under angary of Dutch ships in US ports. The next day, the United States Customs Service seized Oosterdijk in Baltimore, Maryland. On 2 April she was commissioned into the United States Navy and assigned to the Naval Overseas Transport Service, with Lieutenant Commander Arthur H Webber as her commander.

Oosterdijk was refitted at Baltimore, loaded a cargo of general supplies, and then steamed to Norfolk, Virginia, where she loaded naval stores. She continued to New York, where she joined a convoy that left on 25 April for France. She called at Brest, and continued to Saint-Nazaire, where she discharged her general supplies and naval stores. Her return transatlantic crossing took 12 days, and she reached Baltimore on 21 June.

=== Loss ===
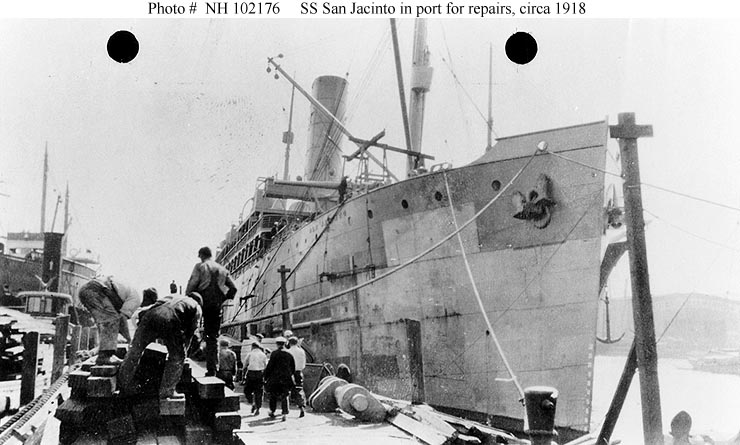
San Jacinto in port after the collision with Oosterdijk

Oosterdijk received minor repairs at Baltimore, bunkered at Norfolk, and on 2 July left New York in her second convoy to France. On 10 July Oosterdijk collided with the passenger-cargo ship San Jacinto in the North Atlantic at position 39°55′N 47°55′W, southeast of Newfoundland. Both ships changed course for the nearest port, but Osterdijk's crew was unable to save her, and she sank at 15:30 hrs that afternoon. San Jacinto rescued all of her crew, and landed them at Halifax, Nova Scotia.

== Bibliography ==
- Lloyd's Register of Shipping. Vol. I.–Steamers. London: Lloyd's Register of Shipping. 1914 – via Internet Archive.
- The Marconi Press Agency Ltd (1914). The Year Book of Wireless Telegraphy and Telephony. London: The Marconi Press Agency Ltd.
