= SS Bungaree (1889) =

British merchant steamship

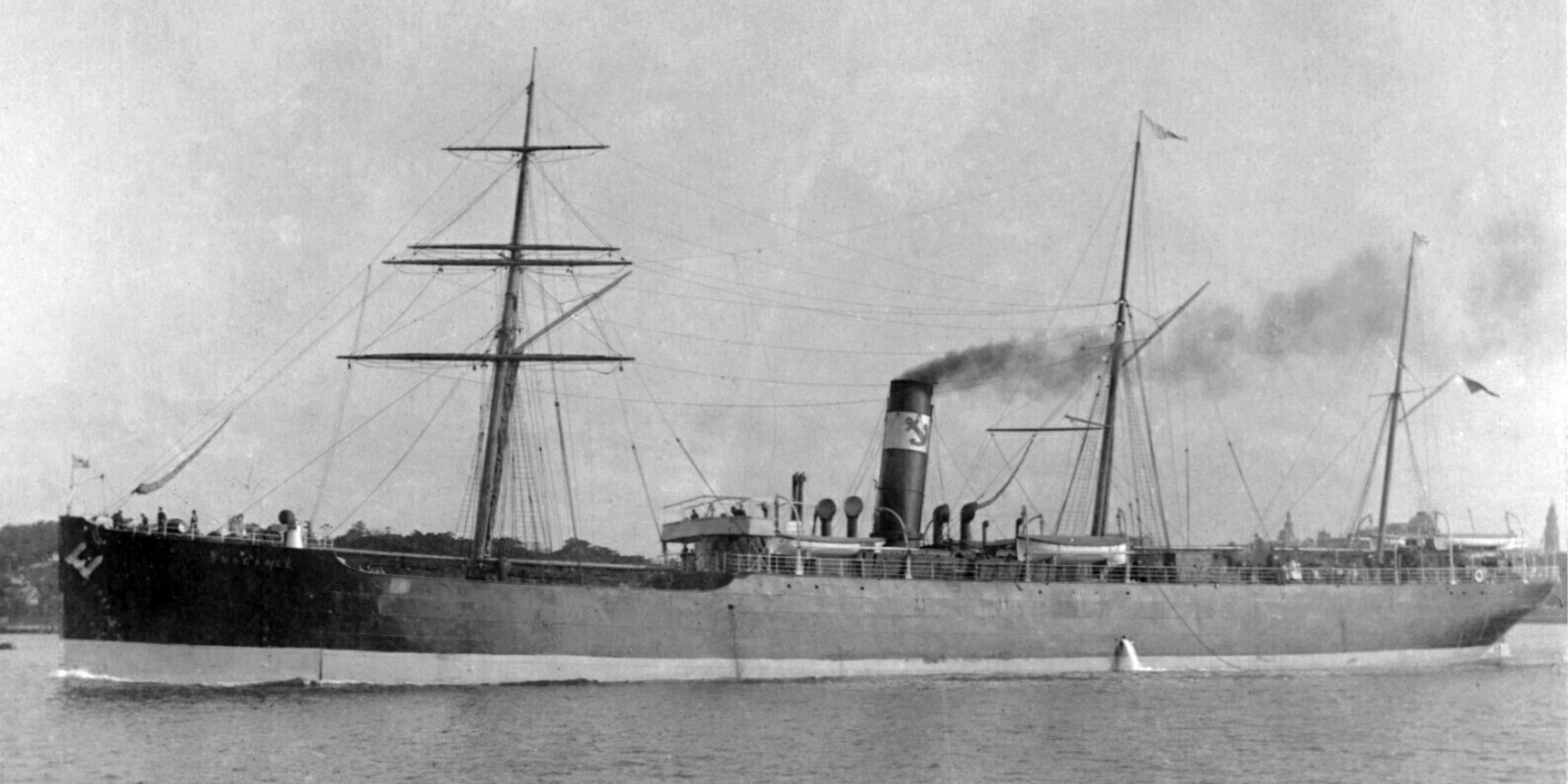
- Bungaree under way

History
- Name: 1889: Bungaree; 1903: Parima
- Owner: 1889: Wilhelm Lund; 1903: Quebec SS Co Ltd; 1923: Bermuda & WI SS Co Ltd
- Operator: 1889: Blue Anchor Line; 1919: Bermuda & WI SS Co Ltd
- Port of registry: 1889: London, United Kingdom; 1917: Montreal, Canada; 1923: Hamilton, Bermuda
- Builder: J Wigham Richardson & Co, Low Walker
- Cost: £43,566 9s 10d
- Yard number: 235
- Launched: 28 August 1889
- Completed: 3 October 1889
- Identification: UK official number 96643; code letters LJCN
- Fate: Scrapped, December 1924

General characteristics
- Type: cargo liner
- Tonnage: 2,893 GRT, 1,859 NRT
- Length: 335.0 ft (102.1 m)
- Beam: 42.1 ft (12.8 m)
- Depth: 24.0 ft (7.3 m)
- Decks: 2
- Installed power: 1 × triple-expansion engine; 420 NHP
- Propulsion: 1 × screw
- Sail plan: barquentine
- Speed: 13.7 knots (25.4 km/h)
- Capacity: as built: 1st & 3rd class passenger berths; 1894 onward: 35,121 cubic feet (995 m^{3}) of holds refrigerated
- Notes: sister ship: Culgoa

SS Bungaree was a steam cargo liner. She was launched in England in 1889 for Blue Anchor Line, who ran her between England and Australia. The Quebec Steamship Company bought her in 1903 and renamed her Parima. Furness, Withy & Company took over the Quebec SS Co in 1919. She was scrapped in Italy in 1925.

== Design and construction ==
J Wigham Richardson & Company of Low Walker, Newcastle upon Tyne built the ship for Blue Anchor Line as yard number 235. She was launched on 28 August 1889 as Bungaree, and completed on 3 October that year. The contract price was £43,566 9s 10d, on which the shipbuilder made a loss of £291 9s 10d.

Her registered length was 335.0 ft (102.1 m); her beam was 42.1 ft (12.8 m); and her depth was 24.0 ft (7.3 m). She carried both cargo and passengers, with both first and third class accommodation. Her tonnages were 2,893 GRT and 1,859 NRT. She had three masts, and was rigged as a barquentine. She had a well deck forward, but not aft. She had a single screw, driven by a three-cylinder triple-expansion engine that was rated at 420 NHP. She achieved 13.7 knots (25.4 km/h) on her sea trials.

J.L. Thompson and Sons of Sunderland built a sister ship to the same design. Culgoa was launched on 25 October 1889, and completed in January 1890. Her beam was a few inches greater than Bungaree's, but they were otherwise identical.

== Career ==
Blue Anchor registered her in London. Her UK official number was 96643, and her code letters were LJCN. One of Blue Anchor Line's trades was wool from Australia to Europe. But in the early 1890s, freight rates for wool were low, so in 1894 Blue Anchor had refrigerating equipment installed in 35,121 cubic feet (995 m^{3}) of Bungaree's holds to carry perishable cargo.

In 1903 the Quebec Steamship Company bought Bungaree and renamed her Parima. By 1914 she was equipped with wireless telegraphy, and in 1917 her registration was transferred to Montreal. In 1919 Furness, Withy & Company took over the Quebec SS Co, and turned it into the Bermuda and West Indies Steamship Company. In 1923 Parima's registration was transferred to Hamilton, Bermuda. In December 1924 she arrived in La Spezia, Italy, to be scrapped.

== Bibliography ==
- Haws, Duncan; Rabson, Stephen (1978). The Ships of the P&O, Orient and Blue Anchor Lines. Merchant Fleets in Profile. Vol. 1. Cambridge: Patrick Stephens Ltd. ISBN 0-85059-319-0.
- Lloyd's Register of British and Foreign Shipping. Vol. I.–Steamers. London: Lloyd's Register of Shipping. 1896 – via Internet Archive.
- Lloyd's Register of British and Foreign Shipping. Vol. I.–Steamers. London: Lloyd's Register of Shipping. 1903 – via Internet Archive.
- Lloyd's Register of Shipping. Vol. II.–Steamers. London: Lloyd's Register of Shipping. 1914 – via Internet Archive.
- Lloyd's Register of Shipping. Vol. II.–Steamers and Motor Vessels. London: Lloyd's Register of Shipping. 1922 – via Internet Archive.
- Lloyd's Register of Shipping. Vol. II.–Steamers and Motorships. London: Lloyd's Register of Shipping. 1924 – via Internet Archive.
- Mercantile Navy List. London: Registrar General of Shipping and Seamen. 1890 – via Crew List Index Project.
- Mercantile Navy List. London: Registrar General of Shipping and Seamen. 1918 – via Crew List Index Project.
- Mercantile Navy List. London: Registrar General of Shipping and Seamen. 1924 – via Crew List Index Project.
