= SS Westerdijk =

Dutch cargo ship that served in the United States Navy in 1918–19

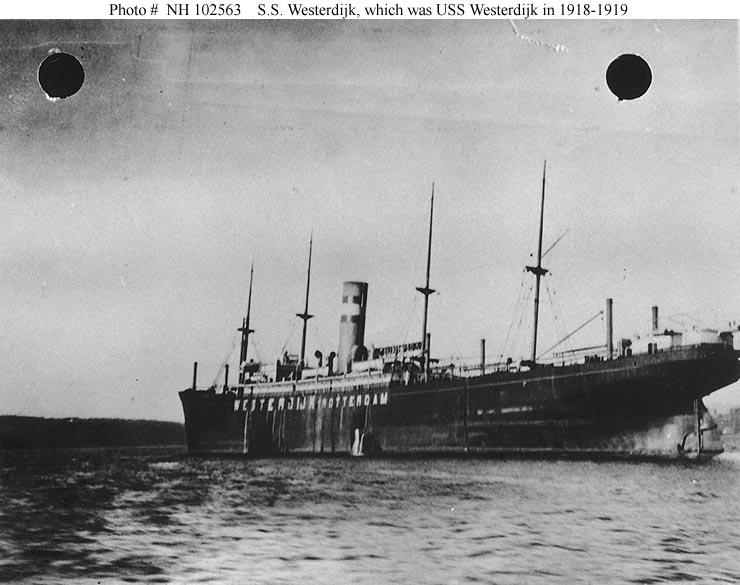
- Westerdijk in Holland America Line colours, with wartime neutrality markings

History

Netherlands
- Name: Westerdijk
- Namesake: Dutch for "West Dyke"
- Owner: 1913: Holland America Line; 1918: NOTS; 1919: Holland America Line
- Operator: (United States) US Navy (1918)
- Port of registry: (Netherlands) Rotterdam
- Builder: Irvine's Sb & DD, West Hartlepool
- Yard number: 523
- Laid down: 14 September 1912
- Launched: 7 May 1913
- Completed: July 1913
- Acquired: by US Govt, 21 March 1918
- Commissioned: into US Navy, 27 March 1918
- Decommissioned: from US Navy, 25 September 1919
- Identification: code letters QCBW; 1914: call sign PGZ; 1918: ID number ID–2514
- Fate: Scrapped in 1933

General characteristics
- Type: cargo ship
- Tonnage: 8,261 GRT, 5,235 NRT, 11,927 DWT
- Displacement: 17,050 tons
- Length: 470.0 ft (143.25 m) overall; 450.4 ft (137.3 m) registered
- Beam: 55.0 ft (16.8 m)
- Draught: 31 ft 9 in (9.67 m)
- Depth: 38.7 ft (11.8 m)
- Decks: 2 + shelter deck
- Installed power: 755 NHP, 4,600 ihp
- Propulsion: 1 × screw; 1 × quadruple-expansion engine
- Speed: 13 knots (24 km/h)
- Capacity: 610,000 cubic feet (17,000 m^{3}) grain, 568,000 cubic feet (16,100 m^{3}) bale
- Complement: in US Navy, 52
- Armament: in US Navy: 1 × 5-inch/51-caliber gun; 1 × 4-inch/40-caliber gun
- Notes: sister ship: Oosterdijk

SS Westerdijk was a Holland America Line cargo steamship that was completed in 1913 and scrapped in 1933. She served in the United States Navy, with the Naval Registry Identification Number ID–2514, from March 1918 until September 1919. Some sources anglicise her name as Westerdyk, but Lloyd's Register registered her with the Dutch spelling Westerdijk.

A smaller cargo steamship, built for a different Dutch shipping company, was also completed in 1913 and called Westerdijk. In 1923 she was sold to German owners, who renamed her Eschersheim. Some sources confuse the two ships, and incorrectly claim that NASM's Westerdijk became Eschersheim.

== Building ==
In 1912 and 1913 Irvine's Shipbuilding & Dry Docks Co Ltd built a pair of sister ships, with consecutive yard numbers, at its shipyard on the River Tees in West Hartlepool, County Durham, England, for the Nederlandsch-Amerikaansche Stoomvaart Maatschappij (NASM), known in English as "Holland America Line". Yard number 522 was laid down on 7 June 1912, launched on 21 February 1913 as Oosterdijk, and completed that May. Yard number 523 was laid down on 14 September 1912, launched on 7 May 1913 as Westerdijk, and completed that July.

Westerdijk's lengths were 470.0 ft (143.25 m) overall and 450.4 ft (137.3 m) registered. Her beam was 55.0 ft (16.8 m) and her depth was 38.7 ft (11.8 m). Her tonnages were 8,261 GRT, 5,235 NRT and 11,927 DWT. Her holds had capacity for 610,000 cubic feet (17,000 m^{3}) of grain, or 568,000 cubic feet (16,100 m^{3}) of baled cargo.

She had a single screw, driven by a four-cylinder quadruple-expansion steam engine built by Richardsons Westgarth & Company of Hartlepool. It was rated at 755 NHP or 4,600 ihp, and gave her a speed of 13 knots (24 km/h).

NASM registered Westerdijk at Rotterdam. Her code letters were QCBW. She was equipped for wireless telegraphy. By 1914 her call sign was PGZ.

== Career ==
On 30 January 1914 in poor visibility Westerdijk ran aground in the Nieuwe Waterweg, blocked the waterway, and collided with Maersk Line's cargo ship Sally Maersk.

In the First World War the Netherlands were neutral, and Westerdijk continued to trade between the Netherlands and the USA. On 27 February 1916 a mine sank the Stoomvaart Maatschappij Zeeland steamship Mecklenburg in the North Sea. Westerdijk rescued her passengers, crew, and mail. SMZ suspended its service.

On 26 March 1916 the Russian schooner Ekonom foundered in the English Channel off St Michael's Mount, Cornwall. Westerdijk rescued her crew.

On 20 March 1918 President Woodrow Wilson issued Proclamation 1436, authorising the seizure under angary of Dutch ships in US ports. The next day, the United States Customs Service seized Westerdijk, probably at NASM's pier in Hoboken, New Jersey. She was given defensive armament of one 5-inch/51-caliber gun and one 4-inch/40-caliber gun.

On 27 March she was commissioned into the United States Navy and assigned to the Naval Overseas Transport Service, with Lieutenant Commander Harold L Thompson as her commander. On 9 April she left New York carrying a cargo of United States Army general stores for the American Expeditionary Forces in France. She made a total of four transatlantic voyages before the Armistice of 11 November 1918.

On her fourth voyage, Westerdijk returned to New York in ballast, and then underwent repairs. She left New York on 19 January 1919, went via the Panama Canal to Chile, loaded general cargo, returned, and unloaded her cargo in New York. She then went to New Orleans, where she loaded 8,153 tons of cargo for the United States Shipping Board. She took her cargo via Norfolk, Virginia to Liverpool, England, where she arrived on 29 July. After unloading her cargo she left Liverpool on 21 September, and arrived back in Rotterdam on 25 September. There she was decommissioned from the US Navy, struck from the Naval Vessel Register, and returned to her owners.

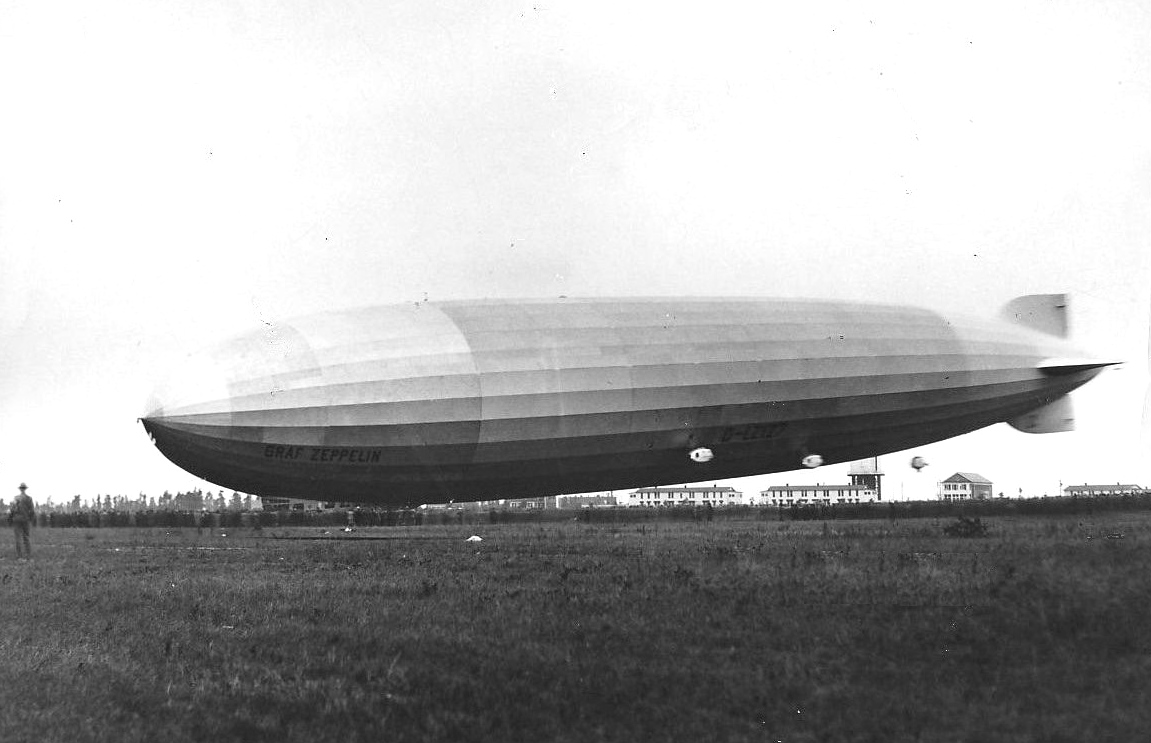
Graf Zeppelin at Lakehurst, New Jersey in 1928

On 30 October 1928, Westerdijk was one of the ships whose wireless telegraphist reported the position of the airship Graf Zeppelin on its maiden transatlantic flight. Westerdijk sighted Graf Zeppelin at 12:15 hrs GMT at position 48°47′N 22°03′W, about 560 nautical miles (1,040 km) west of Ireland, headed southeast. The airship had left Lakehurst, New Jersey on 29 October, and reached Friedrichshaven, Baden-Württemberg on 1 November.

In 1933 NASM sold Westerdijk for scrap to P&W MacLellan of Glasgow. On 15 August that year she arrived in Bo'ness on the Firth of Forth in Scotland to be broken up.

== Bibliography ==
- Lloyd's Register of Shipping. Vol. I.–Steamers. London: Lloyd's Register of Shipping. 1914 – via Internet Archive.
- Lloyd's Register of Shipping. Vol. II.–Steamers and Motorships. London: Lloyd's Register of Shipping. 1924 – via Internet Archive.
- Lloyd's Register of Shipping (PDF). Vol. II.–Steamers and Motorships of 300 Tons Gross and Over. London: Lloyd's Register of Shipping. 1933 – via Southampton City Council.
- The Marconi Press Agency Ltd (1914). The Year Book of Wireless Telegraphy and Telephony. London: The Marconi Press Agency Ltd.
