= SS Wakool =

British-built passenger and refrigerated cargo ship

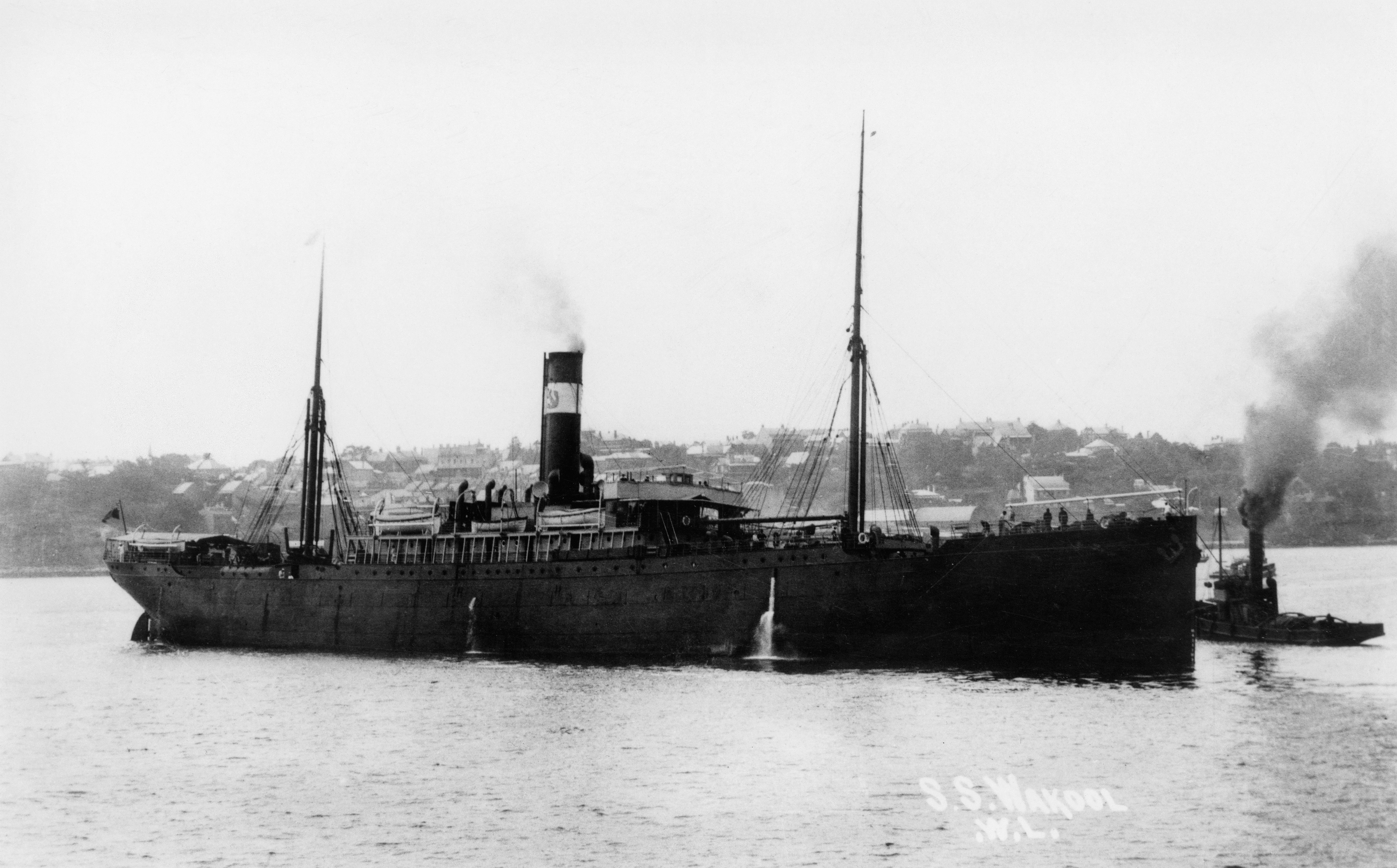
- Wakool

History
- Name: 1898: Wakool; 1913: Kwanto Maru; 1917: Le Myre de Villers
- Namesake: 1898: Wakool, New South Wales; 1917: Charles Le Myre de Vilers
- Owner: 1898: Wilhelm Lund; 1905: Blue Anchor Line; 1910: P&O; 1913: Goshi Kaisha Kishimoto Shokai; 1917: French Government; 1919: Brabant et Pruvost
- Operator: 1905: Wilhelm Lund & Sons; 1919: Messageries Maritimes
- Port of registry: 1898: (United Kingdom) London; 1913: (Japan) Dairen; 1917: (France) Marseille
- Route: 1898: Great Britain – Cape Colony – Australia
- Builder: Sunderland Sb Co, Sunderland
- Yard number: 196
- Launched: 4 August 1898
- Completed: 26 October 1898
- Refit: 1910
- Identification: 1898: UK official number 109996; 1898: code letters QJNW; 1913: code letters QBGP; 1917: code letters ONXE
- Fate: Scrapped, 1923

General characteristics
- Type: refrigerated cargo liner
- Tonnage: 5,004 GRT, 3,147 NRT
- Length: 400.0 ft (121.9 m)
- Beam: 47.5 ft (14.5 m)
- Draught: 25 ft 9 in (7.85 m)
- Depth: 20.2 ft (6.2 m)
- Installed power: 1 × triple-expansion engine; 580 NHP; 3,000 ihp
- Propulsion: 1 × screw
- Speed: 13 knots (24 km/h)
- Capacity: passengers: 50 × saloon class; + steerage for emigrants; cargo: 71,759 cubic feet (2,032 m^{3}) refrigerated
- Notes: sister ships: Narrung, Wilcannia

SS Wakool was a refrigerated cargo liner that was launched in England in 1898. She belonged to Wilhelm Lund's Blue Anchor Line until 1910, when P&O took over the company. She was a troopship in the Second Boer War from 1899 to 1902. In 1913 a Japanese company bought the ship and renamed her Kwanto Maru. In 1914 she was a Japanese depot ship in the siege of Tsingtao. In 1917 the French government bought her and renamed her Le Myre de Villers. The French government sold her in 1923, and she was scrapped in Italy later that year.

== Building ==
Wakool was the second of three sister ships that the Sunderland Ship Building Company in Sunderland, England, built for Lund in the late 1890s. Yard number 186 was launched on 11 July 1896 as Narrung. She had a quadruple-expansion engine that was rated at 516 NHP. Yard number 196 was launched on 4 August 1898 as Wakool. She had a triple-expansion engine that was rated at 580 NHP, but was otherwise similar to Narrung. Yard number 199 was launched on 26 May 1899 as Wilcannia. She had a triple-expansion engine, the same as Wakool.

The ship was named after the town of Wakool in New South Wales. Her registered length was 400.0 ft (121.9 m); her beam was 47.5 ft (14.5 m); her depth was 20.2 ft (6.2 m); and her draught was 25 ft 9 in (7.85 m). She had berths for 50 passengers in "saloon class", and a number of emigrants in steerage. 71,759 cubic feet (2,032 m^{3}) of her cargo holds was refrigerated. Her tonnages were 5,004 GRT and 3,147 NRT. She had a single screw, and a speed of 13 knots (24 km/h).

== Wakool ==
Wakool was registered in London. Her UK official number was 109996, and her code letters were QJNW. Her regular route was between Great Britain and Australia via Cape Colony.

On 14 October 1899, the Admiralty chartered Wakool as Transport number 55 for the Second Boer War. She was in Admiralty service from 17 October that year until 31 December 1902. She took a total of 3,775 officers and men, and 250 horses, to South Africa; and brought a total of 4,252 officers and men, and nine horses, back from the war. The Admiralty paid a total of £188,294 for her charter, fittings, bunkering, and harbour dues.

In 1905 ownership of Wakool was transferred from Wilhelm Lund to Blue Anchor Line, with Lund & Sons as her managers. On 26 January 1910, P&O took over Blue Anchor Line. Wakool became part of the P&O fleet, valued at £30,441. P&O had her refitted, and she began her first P&O voyage on 20 July that year. By 1912 Wakool was equipped with wireless telegraphy.

== Kwanto Maru ==
In April 1913, Goshi Kaisha Kishimoto Shokai bought Wakool for £23,267. She was renamed Kwanto Maru; registered in Dairen in the Kwantung Leased Territory (now Dalian in China); and her code letters were QBGP. In the First World War, Japanese forces used her as a depot ship; particularly during the siege of Tsingtao (now Qingdao) in 1914.

== Le Myre du Villers ==
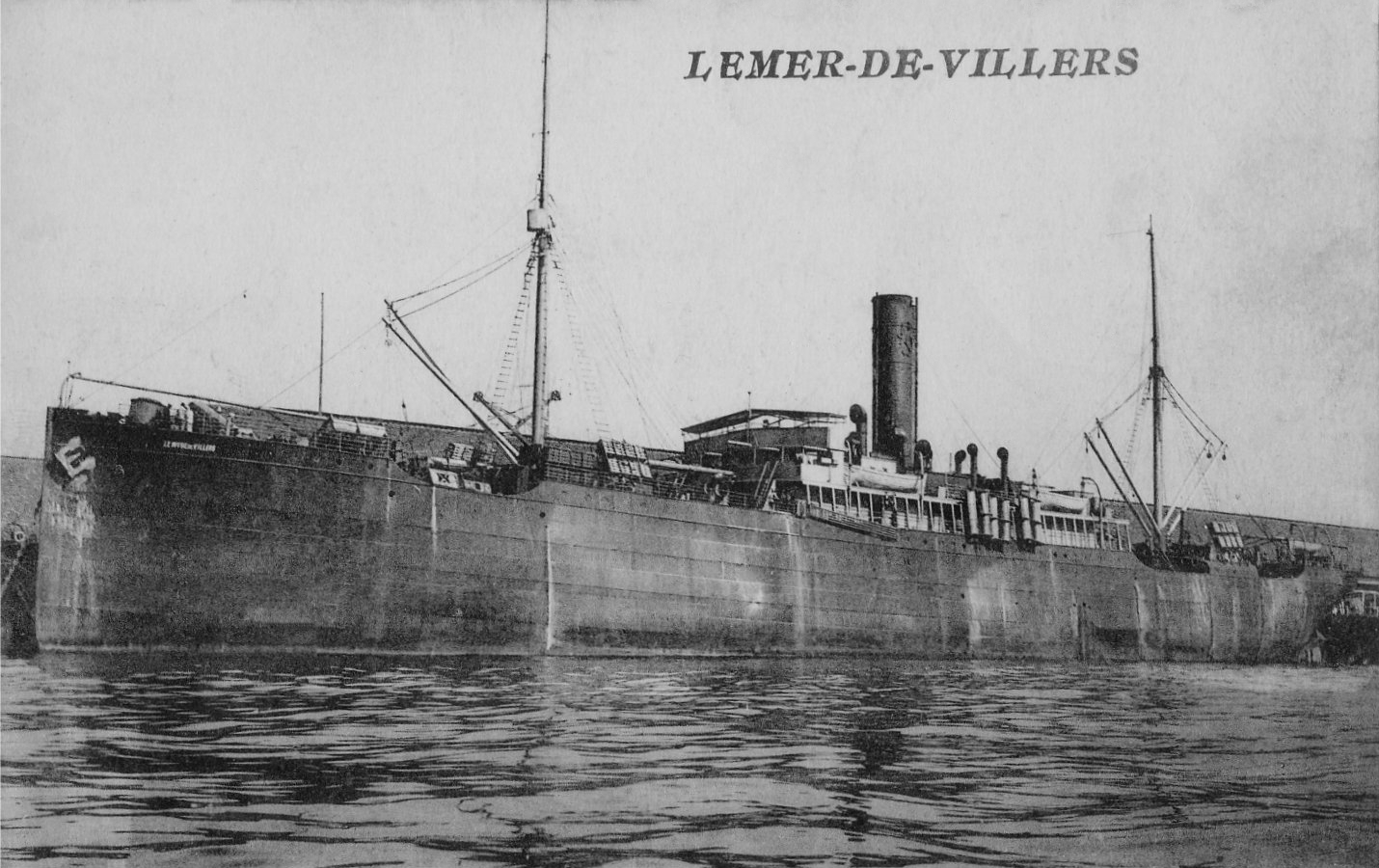
Postcard of Le Myre de Villers

In 1917 the French government bought Kwanto Maru and renamed her Le Myre de Villers. Charles Le Myre de Vilers (1833–1918) had been Governor of Cochinchina and Minister Plenipotentiary to the court of Annam from 1879 to 1882. She was registered in Marseille, and her code letters were ONXE. In 1919 Messageries Maritimes briefly chartered her. Later that year, Brabant et Pruvost bought the ship. In 1923 they sold her for scrap to S Bertorelli, who scrapped her in La Spezia. Scrapping was completed on 23 April 1925.
