= 6th Armoured Brigade (Australia) =

Armoured formation of the Australian Army

- 6th Armoured Brigade Colour Patch
- Active: 1942–1943
- Disbanded: 13 February 1943
- Country: Australia
- Allegiance: Australian Crown
- Branch: Australian Armoured Corps
- Type: Armoured
- Size: Brigade
- Part of: 2nd Armoured Division
- Garrison/HQ: Keswick, Adelaide
- Equipment: Tank

Commanders
- Notable commanders: Frank Wells

The 6th Australian Armoured Brigade was a formation of the Australian Army during World War II. The brigade was formed in May 1942, by the conversion of the 6th Motor Brigade and was assigned to the 2nd Motor Division. The brigade also absorbed units of the 5th Motor Brigade in June 1942. The brigade remained in Australia and did not see any active service before it was converted into the 4th Armoured Brigade in March 1943.

== History ==
The 6th Armoured Brigade was a Militia, or Citizens Military Force (CMF), formation, the only one of its kind raised during the Second World War. Its lineage begins with the 6th Cavalry Brigade, which was formed in South Australia from the existing Militia 8th Light Horse Brigade in the reorganisation of the Australian Army in 1921.

Upon the declaration of war in 1939, the brigade was placed on a war footing. Following the invasion of Malaya, bombing of Pearl Harbor, and fall of Singapore, the 6th was called up for full-time service in Australia. The evolution of Australia's mounted forces, the Australian Light Horse, had lagged well behind that of other countries who had converted their horse mounted cavalry to motorised (trucks) or mechanised (armoured fighting vehicles) forces.

Consequently, the 6th Cavalry Brigade became the 6th Motor Brigade in February 1942, and its subordinate units were also motorised. However, this was short lived and most units never completed the process of motorisation. As part of the broader mechanisation and motorisation of the 2nd Motor Division, which would become the 2nd Armoured Division, the brigade was converted to a mechanised formation, the 6th Armoured Brigade in May 1942, joining the 3rd Motor Brigade and other divisional troops. After moving to Geelong in June, the brigade absorbed several units from the disbanded 5th Motor Brigade.

The brigade was concentrated at the Armoured Fighting Vehicle School, Puckapunyal, in July, where it received US M3 Medium Grant tanks to train with. The brigade proceeded to conduct driving and maintenance, signalling, gunnery, navigation, leadership and tactics training and by the end of 1942 had reached a high standard of efficiency.

By December 1942, the strategic situation had changed again as the Japanese advance had been halted following the battles of the Coral Sea, Guadalcanal and those in New Guinea. It was clear that the large numbers of armoured formations created for the Defence of Australia were no longer needed. Conversely, the demand for reinforcements for the Australian units fighting in New Guinea was increasing. Moreover, the Army was reorganising its units to fight in the jungle. Consequently, the 2nd Armoured Division was ordered to disband in February 1943. The 6th Armoured Brigade headquarters would form the basis of a new tropical warfare establishment armoured formation, the 4th Armoured Brigade. Its units however, would either be disbanded or transferred to other formations.

== Structure ==
The 6th Armoured Brigade included regiments raised from the CMF in both South Australia and Victoria, its organisation was:

- 6th Armoured Brigade Headquarters (formerly 6th Cavalry Brigade Headquarters)
- 3rd Reconnaissance Squadron (3rd Light Horse)
- 12th Armoured Regiment (formerly the 18th Light Horse)
- 13th Armoured Regiment (formerly the 13th Light Horse)
- 14th Armoured Regiment (formerly 104th Motor Regiment, 4th Armoured Regiment and originally C Squadron, 17th Light Horse)
- 9th Motor Regiment (formerly 9th Light Horse)
- 23rd Reconnaissance Company (formerly 23rd Light Horse) was disbanded in May 1942.

== Commanders ==
The following officers commanded the 6th Armoured Brigade:

- Brigadier Frank Wells (July 1942 – March 1943)

== See also ==
- List of Australian Army brigades
