= 12th Armoured Regiment (Australia) =

Tank equipped Australian Army regiment of World War III

12th Australian Armoured Regiment
- Colour Patch of the 12th Armoured Regiment
- Active: 1942–1943
- Disbanded: 13 February 1943
- Country: Australia
- Branch: Australian Armoured Corps
- Type: Armoured Regiment
- Role: Armoured
- Size: Regiment
- Part of: 6th Armoured Brigade
- Garrison/HQ: Adelaide
- Equipment: M3 Medium Grant

The 12th Armoured Regiment was an armoured regiment of the Australian Army, which served during World War II. The regiment was formed in May 1942 as part of the 6th Australian Armoured Brigade. It was originally a Citizens Military Force unit which was converted from the 18th Motor Regiment, formerly the 18th Machine Gun Regiment and previously the 18th Light Horse Regiment (Adelaide Lancers).

== History ==
The 12th Armoured Regiment was formed from the 18th Motor Regiment and was transferred from the Australian Light Horse to the Australian Armoured Corps on 8 May 1942. The regiment, along with the 13th and 14th Armoured Regiments, 9th Motor Regiment and 3rd Reconnaissance Squadron, was allocated to the newly-raised 6th Armoured Brigade, itself part of the newly-converted 2nd Armoured Division. The 12th Armoured Regiment was initially based in Adelaide.

In July 1942, the regiment moved to Puckapunyal with the rest of the 6th Armoured Brigade. At the Armoured Fighting Vehicles School the regiment conducted Officer and Senior NCO leadership and tactics course, prior to conducting specialised training in driving and maintenance, gunnery and wireless for each squadron. The regiment trained on M3 Grant medium tanks and M3 Stuart light tanks, with support elements equipped with a range of carriers, trucks and weapons. Upon completion of elementary training, the regiment conducted squadron and regimental exercises in the Seymour district. At the completion of these manoeuvres the 12th Armoured Regiment, and the 6th Armoured Brigade in general, was at a high standard of training and was well equipped at close to war establishment. The unit achieved AIF status, with at least 65% of its members volunteering for overseas service.

However, by December 1942 the strategic threat to Australia had lessened as the Japanese advance had been halted following the battles of the Coral Sea and Guadalcanal, and the Kokoda Track campaign. Consequently, it was assessed that the large numbers of armoured units created for the defence of Australia were no longer required, and the 2nd Armoured Division was ordered to disband. While elements of the 6th Armoured Brigade were reallocated to other divisions, the 12th Armoured Regiment was disbanded on 13 February 1943.

== Commanding officers ==
- Lieutenant Colonel H.E. Nolte (November 1942 – February 1943)
