= 14th Armoured Regiment (Australia) =

Tank equipped Australian Army regiment of World War III

14th Australian Armoured Regiment
- Colour Patch of the 14th Armoured Regiment
- Active: 1942–1943
- Disbanded: 19 February 1943
- Country: Australia
- Branch: Australian Armoured Corps
- Type: Armoured Regiment
- Role: Armoured
- Size: Regiment
- Part of: 6th Armoured Brigade
- Garrison/HQ: Bendigo
- Equipment: Tank

The 14th Armoured Regiment was a unit of the Australian Army, which served during World War II. The regiment was formed in May 1942 as part of the 6th Australian Armoured Brigade. It was originally a Militia unit which originated from the 17th Light Horse (Machine Gun) Regiment. It was disbanded in early 1943 without seeing combat.

== History ==
The 14th Armoured Regiment was originally drawn from personnel of C Squadron, 17th Light Horse (Machine Gun) Regiment, which was a Victorian Militia unit based around Bendigo. On 1 May 1941, this squadron formed the nucleus of the 4th Armoured Regiment, commanded by Major E.P Seymour. The regiment moved to Ballarat and was brought up to strength from Universal Service (conscripted) personnel and formed part of Headquarters Southern Command. Due to the scarcity of tanks and other armoured vehicles, the unit was only provided with Universal or 'Bren Gun' Carriers, which provided enhanced mobility, but little firepower and protection. A separate Australian Imperial Force (AIF) unit with a similar designation, the 2/4th Armoured Regiment, was raised in late 1942.

When the Japanese entered the war, the regiment was dispatched, as part of the 6th Infantry Brigade (CMF), to serve on the Dandenong Eastern Defence Line and later at Barwon Heads and Torquay beaches. It would return under the command of the 2nd Cavalry Division in February 1942. On 10 February the unit received orders to transfer personnel to the 13th Light Horse and the 17th Machine Gun Regiment. On 9 March 1942 the remaining 4th Armoured Regiment personnel received the order to convert to a motor regiment. It was renamed the 104th Motor Regiment and initially assigned to the 5th Motor Brigade of the 2nd Australian Motor Division. However, the 104th Motor Regiment's existence would prove to be short lived.

The 14th Armoured Regiment was formed from the 104th Motor Regiment on 8 May 1942, and was a part of the Australian Armoured Corps. The regiment, along with the 12th Armoured Regiment, 13th Armoured Regiment, 9th Motor Regiment and 3rd Reconnaissance Squadron, was allocated to the newly raised 6th Armoured Brigade, itself part of the newly converted 2nd Armoured Division. The 14th Armoured Regiment was based at Gherang until the end of June, when it moved to Puckapunyal to join the rest of the brigade.

Upon arrival at the Armoured Fighting Vehicles School, located at Puckapunyal, the unit underwent training to perform its role as an armoured regiment. This included instruction in driving and maintenance, gunnery, wireless communications, tactics and leadership. By the end of 1942 the unit had completed its basic training and had conducted a number of field exercises around the Seymour–Puckapunyal area. It was also largely complete in terms of equipment having been finally equipped with relatively modern M3 Medium Grant tanks and M3 Light Stuarts.

However, by December 1942 the strategic threat to Australia from Japan had lessened. The outcomes of the battles of the Coral Sea and Guadalcanal, and the Kokoda Track campaign led to a re-focus on New Guinea. This meant that the need for large armoured formations to defend Australia had vanished. As a result, the 2nd Armoured Division, and the 6th Armoured Brigade as part of it, was ordered to disband. The 14th Armoured Regiment disbanded on 19 February 1943, although it provided many personnel to the 13th Armoured Regiment The 13th Armoured Regiment would subsequently join the 2nd Armoured Brigade which formed part of the 3rd Australian Armoured Division and was then based in Murgon, Queensland.

== Commanders ==
- Lieutenant Colonel E.P Seymour (1 May 1941 – 19 February 1943)
