= History of the Australian Army =

The history of the Australian Army is the culmination of the Australian Army's predecessors and its 120-year modern history. The Army has its origins in the British Army and colonial military forces of the Australian colonies that were formed prior to the Federation of Australia. These were gradually united into federal units between 1899 and 1903; thus forming the beginning of the Australian Army. The colonial forces were combined and formed the basis of the new army, when the Commonwealth of Australia was founded on 1 January 1901. The modern history of the Army began with its founding at the start of the 20th century as the colonial armies were officially united as the Commonwealth Military Forces. In 1916 the title 'Australian Military Forces' was adopted and remained its official name until 1980, after which it became known as the Australian Army.

For more than 80 years after the establishment of the first British colony, the only professional soldiers in Australia were members of British regiments sent to garrison the continent. By the time that the garrisons were withdrawn in 1870, the six separate self-governing colonies in Australia already had their own separate, part-time reserve units, known as militia or "volunteers". Following economic hardships and subsequent industrial action that was broken up by the colonial forces, the Australian colonies became distrustful of permanent professional standing armies. They preferred a large citizen force and militia that was trained by a small professional force as a defence policy, compared to a large professional force that was supplemented by reserve forces, with this attitude lasting for an extensive period until the postwar period following World War II.

The Australian Army has been involved in many international conflicts, including the Boer War, the First and Second World Wars, the occupation of Japan, the Korean War, the Malayan Emergency and Borneo Confrontation, the Vietnam War, and the wars in Afghanistan and Iraq.

== Origins ==
In January 1788, following the arrival of the First Fleet, the accompanying New South Wales Marine Corps came ashore to become the first modern infantry on the Australian continent. This would start the more than 80 years of precedent that the only professional soldiers in Australia were members of British Army garrisons. The regiment was tasked with the stated purpose to protect the colonists and provide order to the Colony of New South Wales through policing and guarding the transported convicts. On 18 December 1791, the Marines were officially relieved of duty following their reinforcement by the New South Wales Corps (NSW Corps), more infamously known as the Rum Corps, in 1790. The new regiment was assisted by local 'loyal associations' – free settler militias formed in 1801 in response to fears of a convict uprising. Furthermore, the Governor's Body Guard of Light Horse was established in 1803 by the Governor of New South Wales from citizens of the colony. Following orders to establish a penal colony in what is now Tasmania, a company of the NSW Corps accompanied colonists to Van Dieman's Land. After a continued series of disobedient behaviour by the Rum Corps, including the infamous 'Rum Rebellion', the regiment was replaced by the 73rd (Perthshire) Regiment of Foot in 1810; this would also coincide with the disbandment of the militias.

Amidst the colonisation of Australia, parts of the colonial forces participated in the Australian frontier wars, which were a period of conflicts and massacres against the population of Indigenous Australians. One of the most brutal episodes in this period of Australian history was in 1828, when the Governor of Van Diemen's Land declared martial law and initiated a conflict called the Black War that lasted until 1832.

The first conflicts in which large numbers of Australian-born soldiers fought overseas were the New Zealand Wars, between 1863 and 1872, although almost all of these—about 2,500 men—served in New Zealand colonial units, or the British Army. By the time that the garrisons were withdrawn in 1870, the six separate self-governing colonies in Australia already had their own separate, part-time reserve units, known as militia or "volunteers". The colonial governments began to raise professional artillery units, to staff coastal batteries. From 1877 onwards, the British sent officers to advise the colonies on defence matters, and in the early 1880s, the first inter-colonial defence conferences were held.

In 1885, the government of New South Wales sent an infantry battalion, with artillery and support units to the short-lived British campaign in Sudan. During the economic depression of the early 1890s, large-scale strikes in various colonies were met with governments mobilising and/or threatening to use militia against strikers. This was very unpopular and led to successful and historically-significant campaigns against the formation of standing, regular forces. The "two armies" system was established whereby the only infantry units would be militia, although permanent artillery and other support units remained. As Federation of the colonies approached, on 24 August 1899 the colonial artillery units were merged into the first Australian federal army unit.

== Early conflicts ==
=== Boer War ===
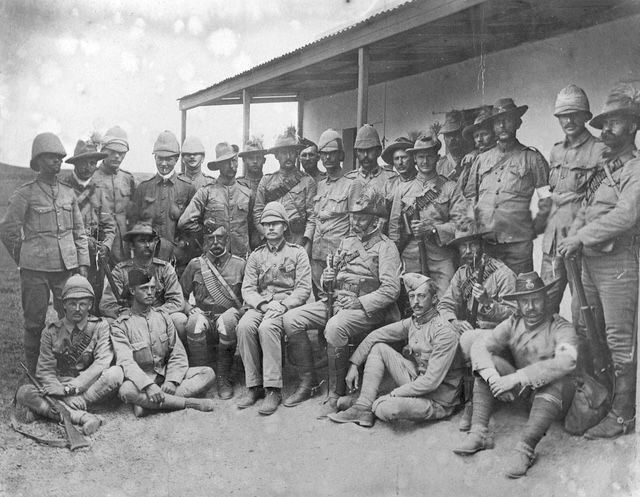
Australian and British officers in South Africa during the Second Boer War

Before Federation of Australia and the forming of the national army, the six self-governing and independent Australian colonial governments sent contingents to South Africa to serve in the Second Boer War. The first offer of 250 mounted troops came from the new colony of Queensland in July 1899, some months before the declaration of war.

The first arrivals of Australian troops was the First New South Wales Contingent which arrived in November 1899, after departing London. A detachment, sent from Australia in October 1899, was known as the Australian Regiment and was an infantry unit, made up mainly of volunteers from the Colonies of Victoria, Tasmania, South Australia and Western Australia, who left on one ship for Cape Town. Due to the way the war developed, these troops were converted from infantry to mounted infantry.

Strong resistance from the Boer Afrikaner forces led to further recruiting in the Australian colonies. Known as Bushmen's Contingents, these soldiers were usually volunteers with horse-riding and shooting skills but no military experience. After Federation in 1901, eight Australian Commonwealth Horse battalions were sent.

Many of the Australian units had a short tour of duty and some were subject to restructuring. Later Australians transferred to, or enlisted into multinational units, such as the Bushveldt Carbineers, in which Harry "Breaker" Morant and Peter Hancock served, before their court martial and execution for alleged war crimes.

Australian units served at many notable actions, including the relief of Mafeking, Sunnyside, Slingersfontein, Pink Hill, the Relief of Kimberley, Paardeburg, Bloemfontein, the Siege of Eland's River, Rhenosterkop and Haartebeestefontein. Australians were there for the capture of Johannesburg and were first into Pretoria. Later they participated at Diamond Hill.

In all, 16,175 Australians, with 16,314 horses, served in the Boer War; 251 were killed in action, 267 died of other causes and 43 went missing in action. Six Victoria Crosses were awarded to Australians, five serving with Australian contingents and one serving with the South African Constabulary. Many Australians did more than one tour of duty and a number remained after the war and settled in-country; while others returned to Australia then returned to South Africa.

=== Boxer Rebellion ===
The Boxer Rebellion in China began in 1900, and a number of western nations—including many European powers, the United States, and Japan—soon sent forces as part of the China Field Force to protect their interests. In June, the British government sought permission from the Australian colonies to dispatch ships from the Australian Squadron to China with Naval Brigade reservists, who had been trained in both ship handling and soldiering to fulfil their coastal defence role. The colonies dispatched 200 men from Victoria, 260 from New South Wales and the South Australian ship HMCS Protector, under the command of Captain William Creswell. Amongst the naval contingent from New South Wales were 200 naval officers and sailors and 50 soldiers headquartered at Victoria Barracks, Sydney who originally enlisted for the Second Boer War. The soldiers were keen to go to China but refused to be enlisted as sailors. The NSW Naval Brigade objected to having soldiers in their ranks. The Army and Navy compromised and titled the contingent the NSW Marine Light Infantry.

== Formation ==
As the Boer War raged, the Commonwealth of Australia was founded on 1 January 1901. On 1 March, 28,923 colonial soldiers, being 1,457 professional soldiers, 18,603 paid militia and 8,863 unpaid volunteers, were transferred to the new Australian Army. However, the individual units continued to be administered under the various colonial Acts. Major General Sir Edward Hutton, a former commander of the New South Wales Military Forces, became the first commander of the Commonwealth Forces' on 26 December and set to work devising an integrated structure for the new army. The Defence Act 1903 brought all of the units under one piece of legislation; more significantly, it prevented the raising of standing infantry units and specified that militia forces could not be used in industrial disputes, and could not serve outside Australia. The vast majority of soldiers remained in militia units, now known as the Citizen Military Forces (CMF). In 1911, two significant changes followed a report by Lord Kitchener: the Royal Military College, Duntroon was established and; a system of universal national service began: boys aged 12 to 18 became cadets, and men aged 18–26 had to serve in the CMF.

== First World War ==
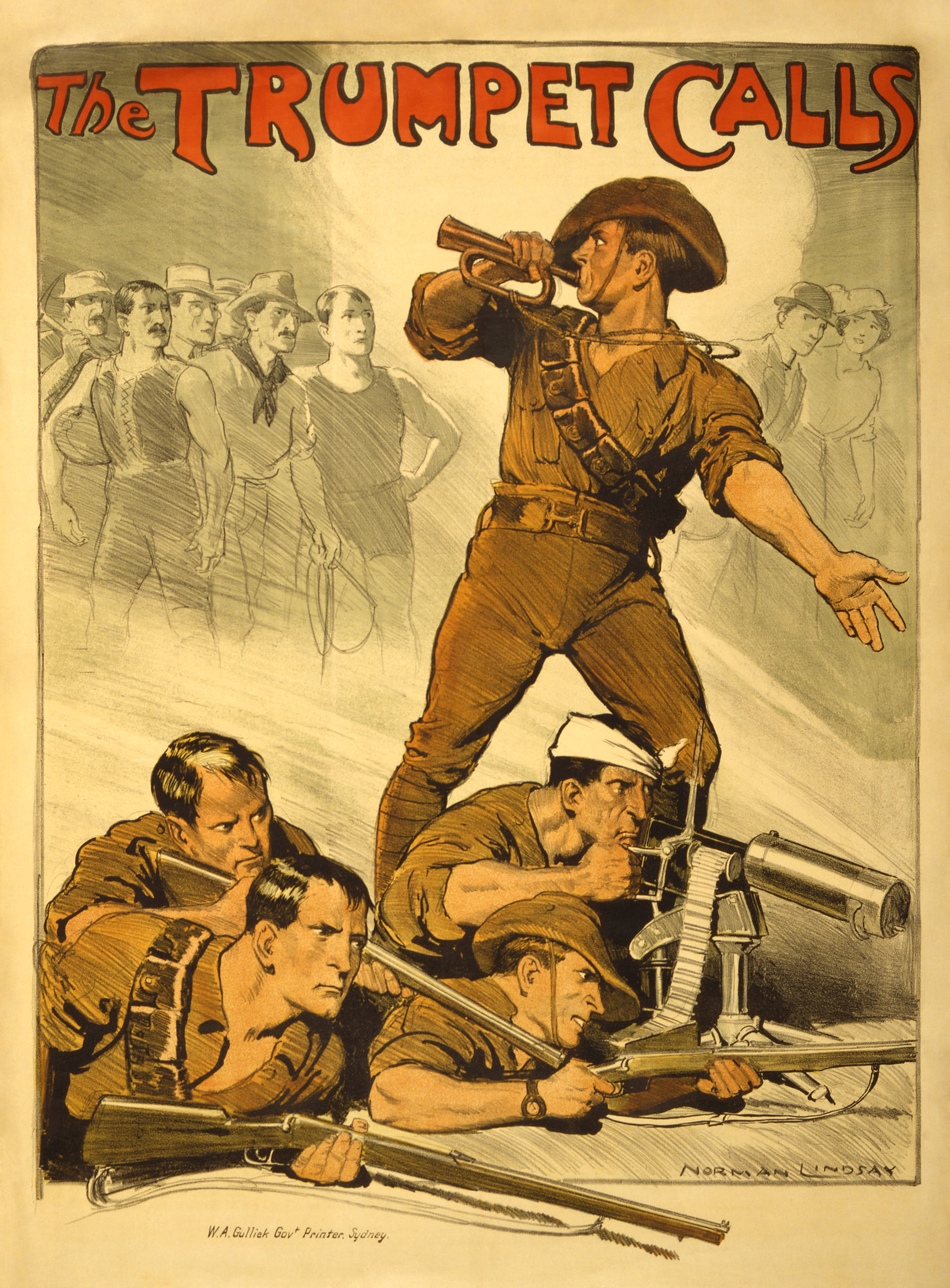
Recruitment poster, 1914–1918.

Following the declaration of war on Germany by the United Kingdom, which began the British Empire's entry into the First World War, the Australian government committed to the war effort without hesitation. This was considered to be expected by the Australian public, because of the very large number of British-born citizens and first generation Anglo-Australians at the time. By the end of the war, almost 20% of those who served in the Australian forces had been born in the United Kingdom, even though nearly all enlistments had occurred in Australia.

Because the existing Citizens Forces were unable to serve overseas, an all-volunteer expeditionary force, the Australian Imperial Force (AIF) was formed on 15 August 1914 with a pledge to supply 20,000 men. It was organised as one infantry division and one light horse brigade plus supporting units, with its first commander being Major General William Bridges, who also assumed direct command of the infantry division.

However, the first target for Australian action was close to home, seizing German colonial outposts in the south-west Pacific and New Guinea. The 2000-man force assembled for this purpose, known as the Australian Naval and Military Expeditionary Force (AN&MEF), landed near Rabaul on 11 September 1914 and after some fighting, the German garrison surrendered on 21 September.

Departing from Western Australia on 1 November 1914, the AIF was sent initially to British-controlled Egypt, to pre-empt any attack by the Ottoman Empire, and with a view to opening another front against the Central Powers. The AIF had four infantry brigades with the first three making up the 1st Division. The 4th Brigade was joined with the sole New Zealand infantry brigade to form the New Zealand and Australian Division.

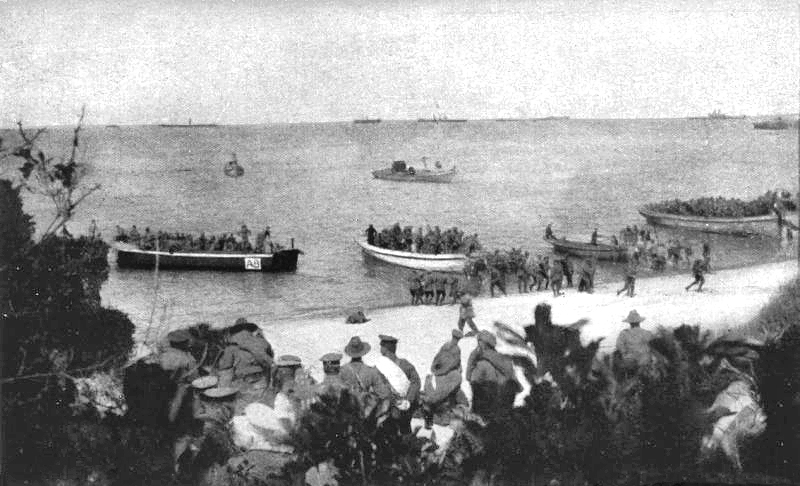
Australian soldiers landing at ANZAC Cove

The combined Australian and New Zealand Army Corps (ANZAC), commanded by British general William Birdwood, went into action when Allied forces landed on the Gallipoli peninsula on 25 April 1915 (now commemorated as Anzac Day). The Gallipoli Campaign would last for eight months of bloody stalemate. By the end of the campaign, Australian casualties were 8,700 killed and 19,000 wounded or sick. The original AIF contingent had continued to grow with the arrival of the 2nd Division which was formed in Egypt and went to Gallipoli in August.

=== Western Front ===
After the withdrawal from Gallipoli, the infantry underwent a major expansion with the first four brigades, the 1st Division and the 4th Brigade being split to create the 12th, 13th, 14th and 15th Brigades. The four new brigades together with the 4th and 8th Brigades formed two additional divisions (4th and 5th). The 3rd Division was formed in Australia and sailed directly to England for further training before moving to the Western Front, in November 1916. The light horse brigades had served dismounted at Gallipoli. In 1916, they were reunited with their horses and formed into the 1st Anzac Mounted Division in Egypt to campaign against Turkish forces in the Sinai and Palestine. Australia also supplied the majority of troops for the newly formed Imperial Camel Corps Brigade.

The first Australian division to mount a major attack on the Western Front was the 5th Division. The attack, the Battle of Fromelles, was a disaster with the division suffering 5,500 casualties for no gain. The 1st, 2nd and 4th Divisions, combined as I Anzac Corps, fought the Battle of Pozières and subsequent Battle of Mouquet Farm, part of the Battle of the Somme. In Egypt, the light horse had helped repulse the Turkish attempt to capture the Suez Canal in the Battle of Romani.

During 1917, the five divisions in France fought in three Allied offensives: the Battle of Bullecourt (part of the Battle of Arras), the Battle of Messines and the Third Battle of Ypres. Meanwhile, the light horse had entered southern Palestine. After two attempts to break through the Turkish defences at Gaza, the decisive victory was achieved in the Third Battle of Gaza in which the Australians captured the town of Beersheba in a dramatic cavalry charge. By the end of the year, British forces had captured Jerusalem.

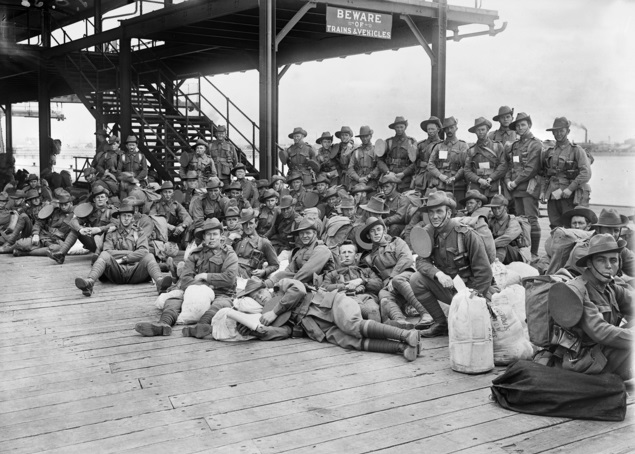
The 10th Reinforcements of the 5th Pioneers at Port Melbourne prior to embarkation, October 1917

The German spring offensive of early 1918 broke through British lines north and south of the Somme. The five Australian divisions which had been formed into the Australian Corps on 1 November 1917, were moved south to help halt the German advance. In May, Australian General John Monash was given command of the Australian Corps and the first operation he planned as a corps commander, the Battle of Hamel, is widely regarded as the finest set-piece strategy of the war on the Western Front. The final Allied offensive began with the Battle of Amiens on 8 August, and the Australian Corps, along with the Canadian Corps and the III British Corps, spearheaded the advance north and south of the Somme. By the end of September, the Australian divisions were severely depleted, with only the 3rd and the 5th fit for immediate action. On 5 October the Australian Corps was withdrawn to rest and saw no more fighting before the war ended.

In the Middle East, the light horse had endured summer in the Jordan Valley before leading the British offensive in the final Battle of Megiddo. The 10th Light Horse Regiment was the first Allied unit to reach Damascus.

A total of 331,814 Australians were sent overseas to serve as part of the AIF, which represented 13% of the Australian male population. About 2,100 women served with the 1st AIF, mainly as nurses. 18% (61,859) of those who served in the AIF were killed or died. The casualty rate (killed or wounded) was 64%, reportedly the highest of any country which took part in World War I. The AIF remained a volunteer force for the duration of the war—the only British or Dominion force to do so. Two referendums on conscription had been defeated, preserving the volunteer status, but stretching the reserves towards the end of the war. The AIF also had a desertion rate larger than Britain, mainly because the death penalty was not in force.

== Interwar period ==
After the end of the First World War, the wartime Australian Imperial Force was demobilised and officially disbanded on 1 April 1921. In the post war period, the Army was reorganised with the focus being placed on the part-time Militia, which was rebuilt to consist of four infantry divisions (the 1st, 2nd, 3rd and 4th), and two cavalry divisions (the 1st and 2nd). In addition, three mixed brigades were raised in Queensland outside the divisional structure (the 11th), Tasmania (the 12th), and Western Australia (the 13th), which would come under the 5th Division's command in the event of a war. The part-time force was maintained through a mixture of volunteers and compulsory service until the compulsory service scheme was suspended in 1929. A small regular force was maintained during this period, based around the Australian Instructional Corps and the Staff Corps, as well as a limited number of engineer, medical, artillery, ordnance, service support personnel. Training and manning through the interwar years was hampered by limited funding as a result of the Depression, as well as limited and obsolete equipment, and many units during this period were well below full strength.

The contingent of soldiers sent to Britain for the coronation of King George VI and Queen Elizabeth in 1937 became the first Australian soldiers to mount the King's Guard in London.

In 1938 the first moves towards the establishment of a regular infantry force were undertaken with the establishment of the Darwin Mobile Force. Due to the provisions of the Defence Act 1903 this force was raised as part of the Royal Australian Artillery, even though it consisted of a large number of infantry.

== Second World War ==
When the Second World War broke out between Britain and Germany in September 1939, the Second Australian Imperial Force (2nd AIF) was formed, to fight in France. The AIF's main strength would consist of four divisions raised in 1939–1940: the 6th, 7th, 8th and 9th. Major General Thomas Blamey was appointed commander of the 2nd AIF. Compulsory military service was introduced: all men over 21 had to complete three months training with the Militia. However, to ensure home defences, Militia members were barred from joining the AIF.

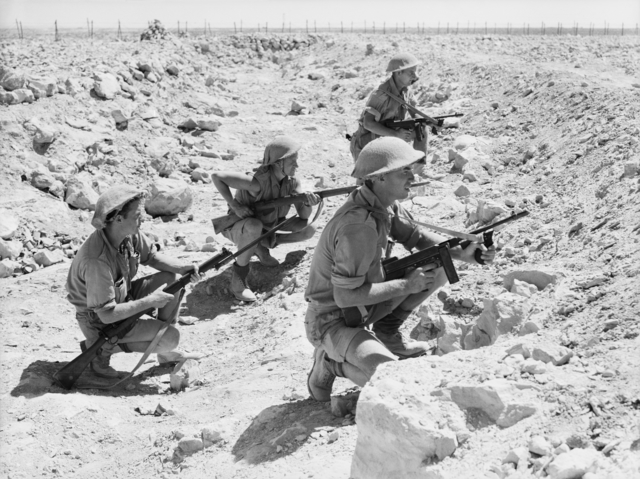
A patrol from the 2/13th Battalion at Tobruk (AWM 020779).

After the British Expeditionary Force (BEF) withdrew from France in the Dunkirk evacuation in the face of the German Blitzkrieg, the 6th, 7th and 9th Divisions, as I Corps, were sent to Egypt. From late 1940, the individual divisions faced Italian and German forces in the North African Campaign. The 6th Division then experienced many casualties in mainland Greece, and on Crete, and 3,000 of its personnel were taken prisoner in this campaign. The 7th Division formed the body of the successful Allied invasion of Vichy French-controlled Lebanon and Syria in 1941. The 9th Division and part of the 7th played a celebrated defensive role at the Siege of Tobruk.

In 1941, a start was made on raising the 1st Armoured Division, as part of the AIF. As fears of war with Japan mounted, most of the 8th Division was sent to Singapore, to strengthen the British garrison; the remaining battalions were deployed in the islands to Australia's north, at Rabaul, Ambon and Timor. Following short but bloody campaigns in Malaya and the islands, virtually all of the 8th Division was lost when stronger Japanese forces swept through South East Asia, in early 1942. In the Battle of Singapore alone, more than 15,000 Australians were taken prisoner. The 6th and 7th Divisions were recalled to Australia, as the country faced the prospect of invasion. While Winston Churchill, the British Prime Minister, had requested that the two AIF divisions be sent to Burma, the Australian Prime Minister, John Curtin, turned down this request, though he did agree to land two brigades of the 6th Division in Ceylon where they formed part of the island's defences during the early months of 1942.

Blamey was appointed Commander-in-Chief (C-in-C) in March 1942; in April a major re-organisation took place: the name First Army —which previously referred to a Militia formation—was reassigned to I Corps, which was expanded to army size with the inclusion of Militia divisions. The First Army's initial area of responsibility was the defence of Queensland and northern New South Wales. The Second Army was responsible for south-eastern Australia; the other components of Australia's defences were III Corps (in Western Australia), the Northern Territory Force and New Guinea Force. Conscription was effectively introduced in mid-1942, when all men 18–35, and single men aged 35–45, were required to join the CMF. In addition, the Army's armoured force was greatly expanded.

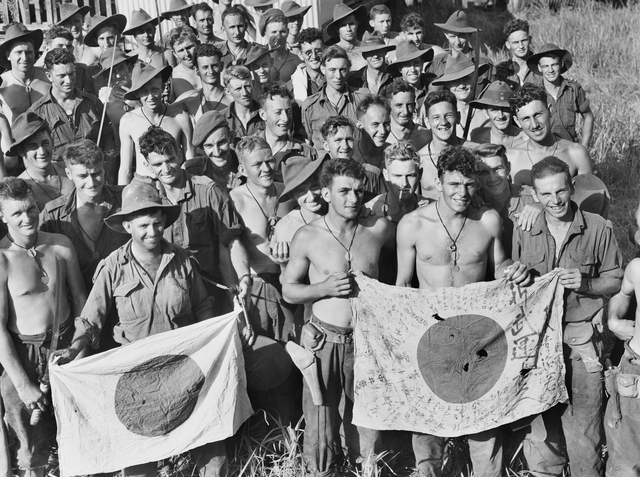
Australian soldiers display Japanese flags they captured at Kaiapit, New Guinea in 1943

In February 1942, a change in regulations meant that if 65% of the official, establishment strength of a Militia unit, or 75 per cent of the actual personnel, volunteered for the AIF, the unit became an AIF unit. At the time, the CMF were often scorned as "chocolate-tin soldiers", or "chockos", because it was thought they would melt in the heat of battle. Nevertheless, Militia units distinguished themselves and suffered extremely high casualties during 1942, in New Guinea, which was then an Australian territory. The prime example was the 39th (Militia) Battalion, many of them very young, untrained and poorly equipped, who distinguished themselves and suffered heavy casualties, in the stubborn rearguard action on the Kokoda Trail.

By late 1942, the 7th Division was beginning to relieve the Militia in New Guinea. In August, as the Kokoda battles raged, Militia and 7th Division units formed the bulk of Australian forces at the Battle of Milne Bay, the first outright defeat inflicted on Japanese land forces. The 6th and 7th Divisions, with Militia units and elements of the 1st Armoured, formed a large part of Allied forces which destroyed the major Japanese beachhead in New Guinea, at the Battle of Buna-Gona. In 1943, the Defence Act was changed to allow Militia units to serve south of the Equator in South East Asia. The 9th Division remained in North Africa and distinguished itself at the Second Battle of El Alamein, after which victory over Erwin Rommel was assured, and returned to Australia in 1943. Later that year it was pitched into battle against Japanese forces in New Guinea.

General Douglas MacArthur, the Supreme Allied Commander in the South West Pacific, was resented for his treatment of Australian forces. After the surrender of American forces in the Philippines, Australian ground forces constituted almost all of MacArthur's ground forces. As US forces re-built, however, he increasingly used Australian units for secondary assignments. The campaign on Bougainville after the departure of US forces is considered to be an example of this.

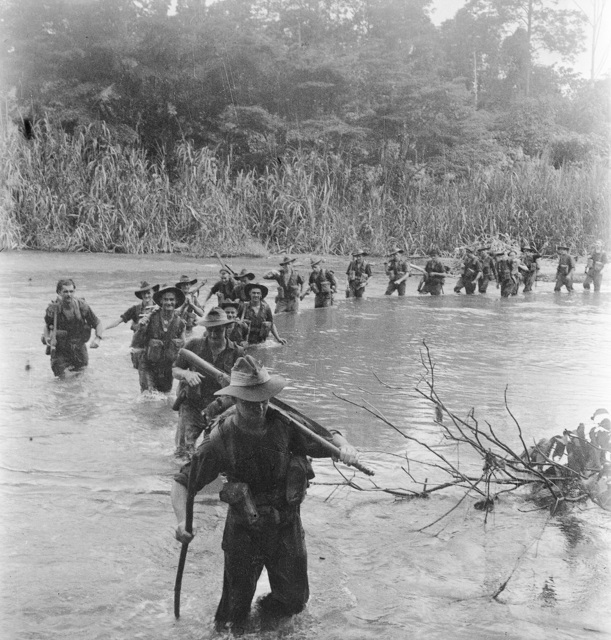
Australian soldiers in New Britain in 1945 (AWM 092342).

The 1st Army took responsibility for mopping-up and controlling areas which flanked US forces' "island-hopping" campaign towards Japan. Australian units were also responsible for the last phase of amphibious assaults during the Pacific War: the attacks on Japanese-occupied Borneo, including Tarakan, Brunei, British Borneo, Balikpapan and other targets in Sarawak. Meanwhile, Australian prisoners of the Japanese, were often held in inhumane conditions, such as Changi prison, or in Japan itself. Some were also subject to severe forced labour, including the Burma Railway, or forced long distance marches, such as on Sandakan. There was a very high death rate among Allied prisoners of the Japanese.

A planned invasion of the Japanese home island of Honshū in 1946, Operation Coronet, would probably have included a proposed 10th Division, formed from existing AIF personnel. The operation never proceeded as Japan surrendered prior. Compulsory military service ended in 1945, and most Australian personnel had been demobilised by the end of 1946. Out of more than 724,000 army personnel during World War II, almost 400,000 served outside Australia. More than 18,000 died; 22,000 were wounded and more than 20,000 became prisoners of war.

=== Occupation of Japan ===
The British Commonwealth Occupation Force (BCOF), was the name of the joint Australian, British, Indian and New Zealand military forces in occupied Japan, from 21 February 1946 until the end of occupation in 1952. Overall, Australians made up by far the biggest proportion of BCOF, and the army made up of most of the Australians, with the position of General Officer Commanding (GOC) BCOF always filled by an Australian Army officer. At its peak, BCOF comprised 40,000 personnel, equal to about 10% of the US military personnel in Japan. The army contingent was centred around Australia's first ever standing infantry unit, the 34th Infantry Brigade, which had been formed from 2nd AIF and Militia personnel on Morotai in late 1945.

While US forces were responsible for military government, BCOF was responsible for supervising demilitarisation and the disposal of Japan's war industries. BCOF was also responsible for occupation of the western prefectures of Shimane, Yamaguchi, Tottori, Okayama, Hiroshima and Shikoku Island. BCOF headquarters was at Kure. According to the AWM:

Australian army .... personnel were involved in the location and securing of military stores and installations. The Intelligence Sections of the Australian battalions were given targets to investigate by BCOF Headquarters, in the form of grid references for dumps of Japanese military equipment. Warlike materials were destroyed and other equipment was kept for use by BCOF or returned to the Japanese. The destruction or conversion to civilian use of military equipment was carried out by Japanese civilians under Australian supervision. Regular patrols and road reconnaissances were initiated and carried out in the Australian area of responsibility as part of BCOF's general surveillance duties.

Meanwhile, planning for post-war defence arrangements had come to the conclusion that the Australian Army should be predicated on maintaining a relatively strong peacetime force. This was a significant departure from past Australian defence policy which had previously relied on citizen forces, the Australian Army would include a permanent field force of 19,000 regulars organised into a brigade of three infantry battalions with armoured support, serving alongside a part-time force of 50,000 men in the Citizen Military Forces. The Australian Regular Army was subsequently formed on 30 September 1947, while the CMF was re-raised on 1 July 1948. Thus, the three battalions in the 34th Brigade were redesignated to form the nucleus of the new regular army as the Royal Australian Regiment in 1947, and the brigade itself was reformed as the 1st Brigade.

The Australian component of BCOF was responsible for over 20 million Japanese citizens, within a 57,000 square kilometre area. During 1947, the BCOF began to wind down its presence in Japan. However, BCOF bases provided staging posts for Australian and other Commonwealth forces deployed to the Korean War, from 1949 onwards. BCOF was effectively wound-up in 1951, as control of Commonwealth forces in Japan was transferred to British Commonwealth Forces Korea.

In 1953, a contingent of the army was again sent to the coronation, this time of Queen Elizabeth II. Again it mounted the Queen's Guard alongside the Canadian Army contingent.

== The Cold War ==
=== Korean War ===
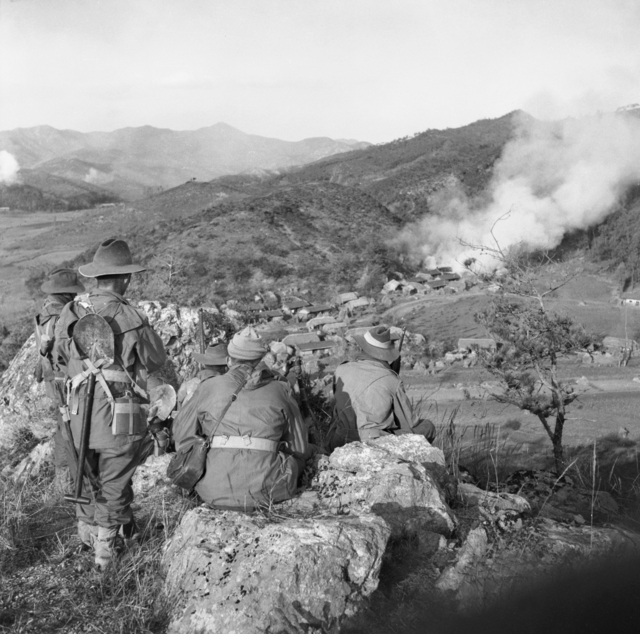
Soldiers from 3 RAR watch as a Korean village burns in late 1950

=== Malayan Emergency ===
Although the Royal Australian Air Force had been conducting operations in Malaya since 1950, it was not until October 1955 that the first Army battalion, 2nd Battalion, Royal Australian Regiment (2RAR), was deployed to Penang. However, the battalion did not have approval from the government to conduct operations until January 1956, when it conducted a search and security mission in Kedah. The mission, code-named Operation Deuce, lasted until late April 1956 when 2RAR transferred responsibility of their area to the 1st Battalion, Royal Malay Regiment. In May, 2RAR conducted Operation Shark North in Perak. It was withdrawn from combat operations in August 1957 and left Malaya in October 1957. The battalion suffered 14 killed.

In September 1957, 2RAR was replaced by the 3rd battalion, Royal Australian Regiment (3RAR), which began patrols as part of Operation Shark North in December. In January 1958, 3RAR began Operation Ginger, a major operation designed to disrupt the food supply to the communist forces. Ginger continued until April 1959 when Perak was declared a safe area. The battalion was withdrawn from operations in September 1959, returning to Australia in October. It had four killed during its tour.

In October 1959, 3RAR was replaced by 1RAR. Following a month spent climatising to the jungle, 1RAR participated in Operation Bamboo, a deep jungle search near the Thai-Malay border. This operation met with little success, as insurgents could cross over the border into Thailand, where they could not be followed. In April 1960, 1RAR began Operation Magnet, the first operation in which Australian forces were able to cross the border into Thailand. However, Magnet did not result in any engagements.

In July 1960, the Malayan Prime Minister declared the emergency over. Despite this, 1RAR continued operations until the end of its tour in October 1961. The battalion suffered two deaths during its tour.

From October 1961 to August 1963, 2RAR conducted its second tour of duty in Perlis and Kedah.

In 1960 the Army was restructured onto the Pentropic organisation in an attempt to improve its combat power and align it with the US Army. This organisation proved unsuccessful, however, and it reverted to its previous unit organisations in 1965.

=== Vietnam War ===
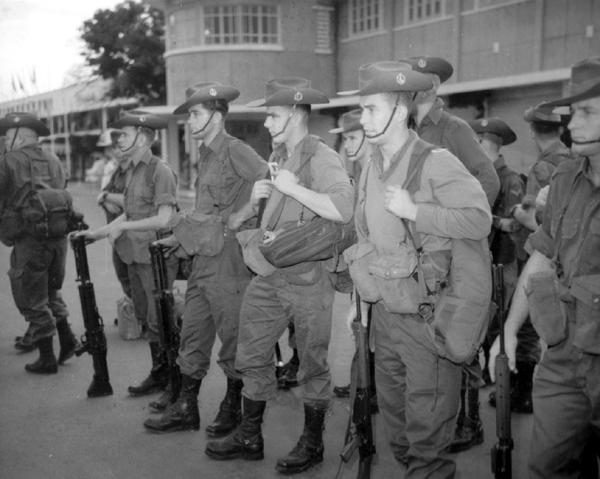
Australians arrive at Tan Son Nhut Airport, Saigon

Australian Army's commitment into Vietnam commenced with a contingent of a specialist group called the Australian Army Training Team Vietnam (AATTV) which commenced in 1962. Later Australian troops and their supports arrived and were assigned the Phuoc Tuy province. The 1st Australian Task Force was based in the province between 1966 and 1971 and consisted of infantry battalions, a Special Air Service Squadron, an artillery regiment and supporting engineer, armoured and armoured personnel carrier squadrons.

While the Army fought few major battles, Australian soldiers fought and destroyed large Vietnamese Communist forces during the Battle of Long Tan 1966 and the fighting around Firebase Coral and the heavy operations in the Long Hai hills (1970). The Australian Army was highly trained at jungle warfare as all infantry and combat units completed a gruelling jungle training course at Canungra in Queensland pre-posting into Vietnam. In all, some 50,000 Australians served in Vietnam of which 520 were killed in battles and many due to mines.

The Australians style of warfare differed to that used by the United States Army. The Australians were masters of stealth, patrolling, tracking, searching and ambushing and hitting the enemy's flanks. In 1970, the 1st Australian Task Force in Phuoc Tuoy Province was according to Robert Hall, "the most potent allied military force ... yet was frequently tied up with reconnaissance-in-force operations".

=== The Forgotten Years (1972–1990) ===
In 1988, as part of the celebrations for Australia's bicentennial, a detachment of soldiers from the 1st Battalion, Royal Australian Regiment became the first Australian troops in a generation to mount the Queen's Guard at Buckingham Palace in London.

=== United Nations Transition Assistance Group (UNTAG) 1989–90 ===
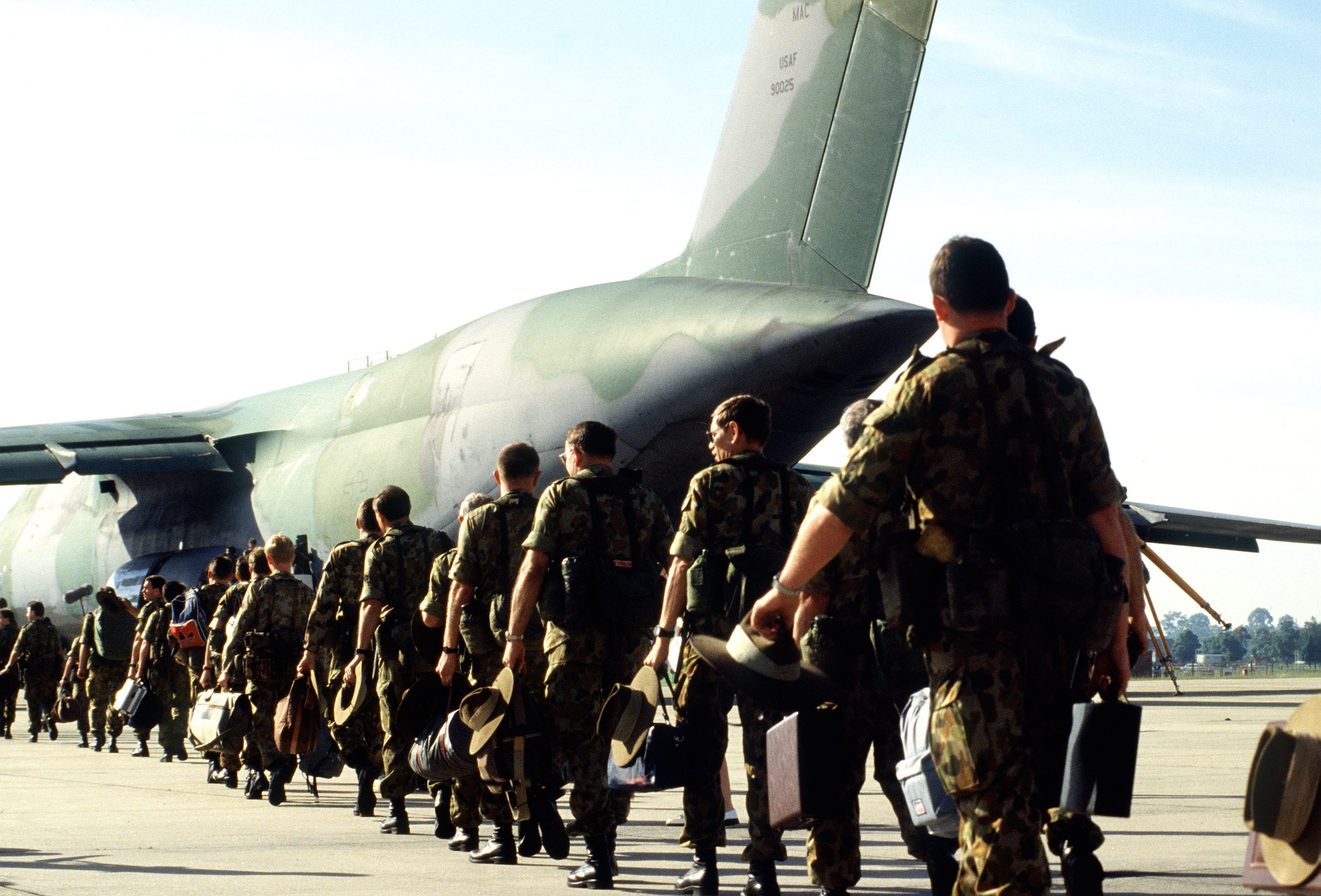
Australian engineers board the United States C-5 Galaxy aircraft which will transport them to Namibia

In 1979, the UN General Assembly passed Resolution 435 which called for a peace keeping force to be deployed into the then South West Africa to provide assistance with its transition to the independent nation of Namibia. The multi-national force was to comprise approximately 8,000 military personnel and a large contingent of Civilian Police. However, due to significant difficulties within the UN and in having South African forces withdrawn, the UN force did not deploy until 1989.

Australia deployed a combat engineer force of approximately 310 all ranks as part of the military force. The Australian contingent provided engineering support to the UN Force throughout its deployment. Tasks included numerous major construction projects including road and airfield construction, buildings, barracks, schools and other infrastructure to support the UN. The Australians also provided a wide range of assistance to the Namibian people by constructing a variety of civil projects.

Of note was the task of battlefield clearance after twenty years of warfare. Much of Namibia was in conflict and resulted in millions of land mines being laid around civilian communities and areas along the northern land border. The removal of these land mines was left to the South African Army, however, tens of thousands remained when RSA forces finally withdrew in 1990. The task then fell to the Australians. Despite the significant danger of this task, a 98% success rate was achieved with many civil communities becoming safe for the first time in decades.

The Australia force rotated once after six months deployment and provided continuous engineer support to the UN and Namibia. The force achieved its mission without sustaining any fatalities, making it one of the few military units in UNTAG to do so. Australia's contribution to UNTAG was a success and, as the first deployment of troops to a war zone since the Vietnam War, paved the way for future deployments.

== Recent history (1991–present) ==
=== Gulf War ===
The Australian Army's contribution to the 1991 Gulf War was limited to a small detachment from the 16th Air Defence Regiment. This detachment provided point defence for the Royal Australian Navy ships HMAS Success and HMAS Westralia. A small number of Australian officers on exchange to the British and United States armies served as part of the units they had been posted to. Following the end of the war an Australian Medical Unit of 75 personnel drawn mostly from the Army's 2nd Field Ambulance was briefly deployed to northern Iraq as Australian's contribution to Operation Provide Comfort (designated 'Operation Habitat' by the Australian Defence Force). The Australian Medical Unit operated in Northern Iraq between 16 May and 30 June 1991.

=== Peacekeeping ===
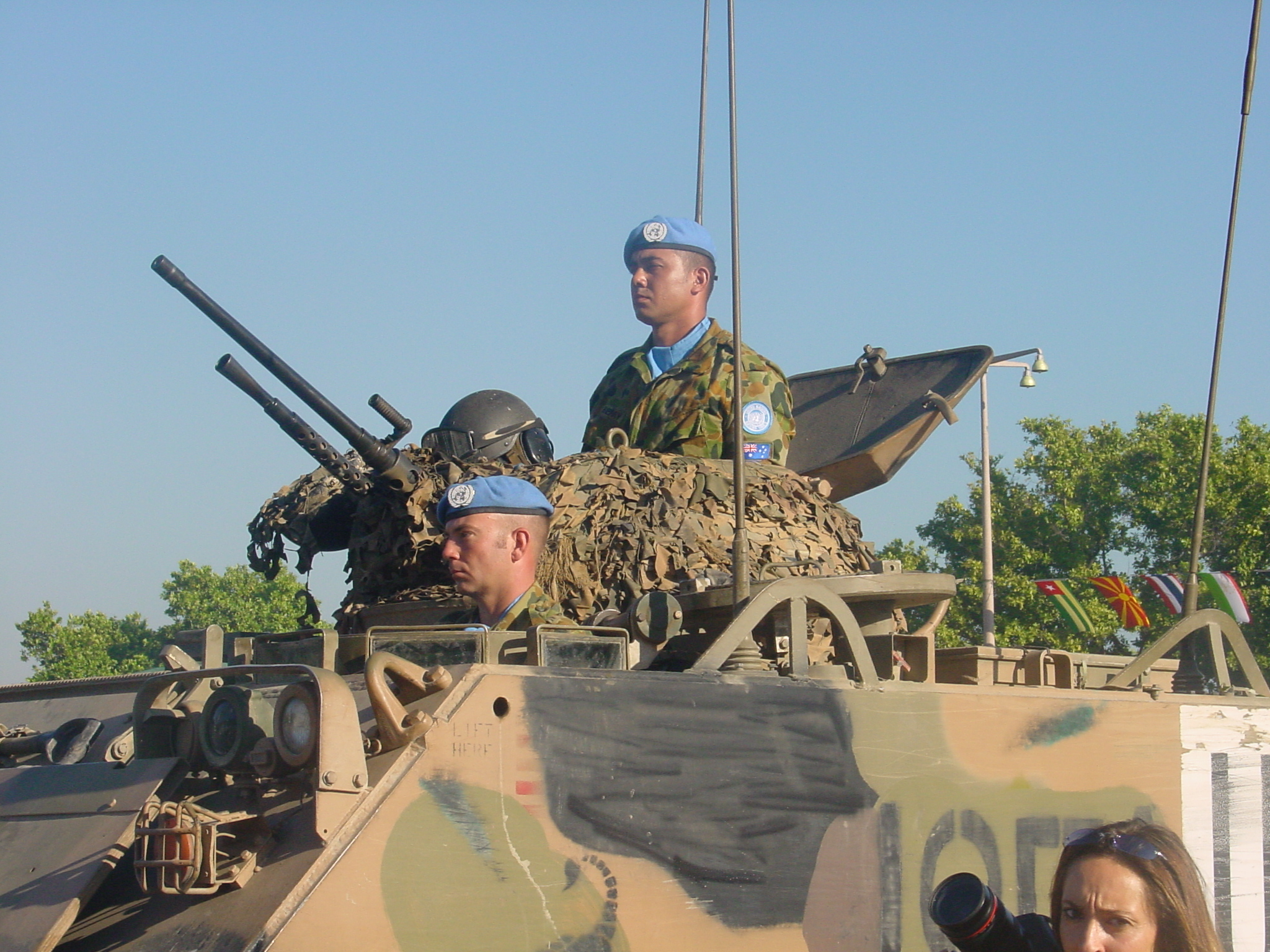
Australian troops in East Timor in May 2002

Following the independence referendum of East Timor from Indonesia, Australian troops were sent in to control the ensuing violence

=== War in Afghanistan ===
Australia, as one of the many countries who sent troops to Afghanistan, provided specialist SAS teams for use against Taliban/Al Qaeda forces.

=== Iraq War ===
Australia was one of the countries to provide combat forces for the US-led invasion of Iraq. In Australia it was known as Operation Falconer. In all Australia contributed some 2,000 personnel. The Army contribution to this was 500 soldiers. Following the end of major combat operations, Australia announced a withdrawal of most of its forces in Iraq. It left behind approximately 950 troops in the theatre. These included naval forces, support troops (such as air traffic controllers) and a security detachment of about 75 soldiers in strength to defend key Australian interests. In February 2005, Prime Minister John Howard announced an increase in the Australian presence by about 450 to provide protection for Japanese troops and assist in training Iraqi troops. This force, designated the Al Muthanna Task Group, was deployed to Southern Iraq in May 2005. After Al Muthanna province gained provincial control in mid 2006, the Australian force transitioned into a new role and was retitled the Overwatch Battle Group. OBG(W) relocated its forward operating base from Camp Smitty (outskirts of As Samawah, Al Muthanna province) to Tallil Air Base (outskirts of Nasiriyah, Dhi Qar province) effectively co-locating with the Australian Army Training Team Iraq (AATTI). Australia's contribution to operations in Southern Iraq involved combat overwatch of both Al Muthanna and Dhi Qar province, conduct of CIMIC operations and provision of support and training to the Iraqi Security Forces. After the Labor Government gained power in late 2007, most Australian forces were withdrawn from Iraq in mid-2008.

=== Other events ===
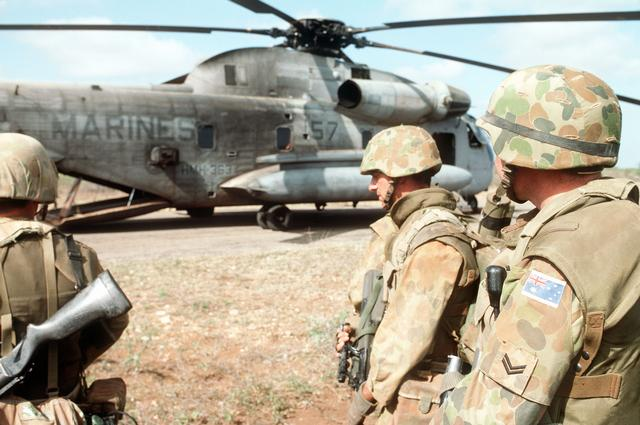
Australian soldiers in Somalia during Operation Solace

In 2000, the Federation Guard was formed – this was a tri-service unit consisting of personnel from the army, RAN and RAAF to serve as ceremonial guards during the celebrations of Australia's Centenary of Federation the following year. In July 2000, a detachment mounted the Queen's Guard in London for three weeks; this included four women, under the command of Captain Cynthia Anderson. These were the first women ever to serve as guards at Buckingham Palace.

In August 2009, an alleged plan to attack the Holsworthy Barracks was uncovered by the Australian Federal Police. The alleged terrorist plot was to storm Holsworthy Barracks, a training area and artillery range for the Australian Army located in the outer south-western Sydney suburb of Holsworthy, with automatic weapons; and shoot army personnel or others until they were killed or captured.

== See also ==
- Battle and theatre honours of the Australian Army
- Uniforms of the Australian Army

== Notes ==
=== References ===
- Dennis, Peter; Grey, Jeffrey; Morris, Ewan; Prior, Robin; Bou, Jean (2008). The Oxford Companion to Australian Military History (Second ed.). Melbourne: Oxford University Press. ISBN 978-0-19-551784-2.
- Grey, Jeffrey (1999). A Military History of Australia (Second ed.). Port Melbourne: Cambridge University Press. ISBN 0-521-64483-6.
- Grey, Jeffrey (2008). A Military History of Australia (3rd ed.). Melbourne: Cambridge University Press. ISBN 978-0-521-69791-0.
- Hall, Robert A. (2000). Combat Battalion: The Eight Battalion in VietNam. Crows Nest: Allen & Unwin.
- Kuring, Ian (2004). Red Coats to Cams. A History of Australian Infantry 1788 to 2001. Sydney: Australian Military History Publications. ISBN 1-876439-99-8.
- Nicholls, Bob (1986). Bluejackets & Boxers: Australia's Naval Expedition to the Boxer Uprising. North Sydney: Allen & Unwin. ISBN 0-86861-799-7.
- Palazzo, Albert (2001). The Australian Army: A History of its Organisation 1901–2001. Melbourne, Victoria: Oxford University Press. ISBN 0-195515-07-2.
- Palazzo, Albert (2002). Defenders of Australia: The 3rd Australian Division 1916–1991. Loftus, New South Wales: Australian Military Historical Publications. ISBN 1-876439-03-3.
