= 18th Light Horse Regiment =

Australian Army regiment (1921–1942)

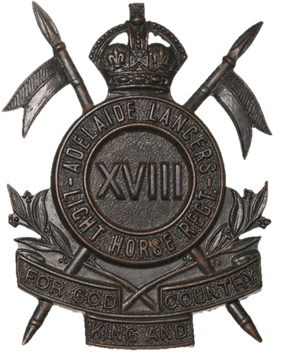
- Hat badge of the 18th Light Horse Regiment
- Active: 1921–1942
- Country: Australia
- Branch: Australian Light Horse
- Type: Cavalry
- Role: Divisional cavalry
- Size: Regiment
- Part of: 6th Cavalry Brigade
- Garrison/HQ: Adelaide
- Mottos: "For God, King and Country"
- Battle honours: ANZAC, GALLIPOLI 1915, EGYPT 1915–17, PALESTINE 1917–18

Insignia
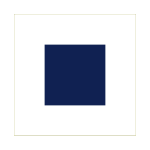
- Unit colour patch

The 18th Light Horse Regiment (Adelaide Lancers) was a Citizens Military Force unit of the Australian Light Horse, formed during the post-World War I reorganisation of the Australian Army. The regiment traces its origins back to the militia cavalry regiments raised in the colony of South Australia, such as the Adelaide Cavalry Squadron, the Adelaide Mounted Rifles and the South Australian Mounted Rifles. This is a different unit to the pre-World War I, 18th Australian Light Horse (Western Australian Mounted Infantry).

== History ==
=== Formation ===
The 18th Light Horse Regiment was formed on 31 March 1921, drawing upon elements of the existing Light Horse regiments in South Australia for personnel. It was headquartered at Unley, in Adelaide. The initial role of the 18th was as divisional cavalry for the 2nd Cavalry Division, although it routinely trained with the South Australian-based 6th Cavalry Brigade, which included the 3rd Light Horse, 9th Light Horse, 23rd Light Horse and supporting units.

=== Interwar period ===
During the 1920s the Australian Light Horse converted from their pre-war mounted rifles role to that of cavalry modelled along British Army lines. However, by the end of the 1920s the stringent financial situation across the Army, and the suspension of the compulsory training scheme, led to the amalgamation of a number of light horse units. This led to the linking of the 18th with the 23rd Light Horse Regiment to form the 18th/23rd Light Horse Regiment in 1929. The 23rd Light Horse was not maintained during the period in which they were linked with the new unit remaining in the former 18th Light Horse locations.

In October 1936, the units were unlinked and the 18th was raised as the 18th Light Horse (Machine Gun) Regiment (Adelaide Lancers). Around this time, the regiment was awarded four battle honours for the service of predecessor units that had fought during World War I. As a machine gun regiment they provided fire support to the 2nd Cavalry Division, based in Victoria and South Australia. They were equipped with Vickers Medium Machine Guns which were transported via civilian trucks which were hired from members of the unit given the very limited motorisation which the Army had undergone by this time. By 1938, the 18th Light Horse (Machine Gun) Regiment was part of the 6th Cavalry Brigade along with the 3rd and 9th/23rd Light Horse Regiments.

=== World War II ===
In the late 1930s, the regiment came under the command of Lieutenant Colonel Arthur Blackburn, VC. As the prospect of war loomed again in 1939, the unit prepared for service overseas. However, when the Second World War broke out and this did not eventuate, Blackburn and many of the officers and men of the unit joined the 2nd Australian Imperial Force's 2/3rd Machine Gun Battalion, which fought in Syria and later formed part of the ill-fated Black Force in Java. The unit was converted to the 18th Motor Regiment in March 1942. However, this proved to be a short-lived step as on 8 May 1942 the unit was ordered to convert to an armoured regiment and was renamed the 12th Armoured Regiment. At this time the unit was transferred to the Australian Armoured Corps.

=== Perpetuation ===
Following the Second World War, the South Australian light horse units were perpetuated through the 3rd/9th South Australian Mounted Rifles, which was raised as part of the Royal Australian Armoured Corps.

== Alliances ==
- 18th Royal Hussars (Queen Mary's Own)
