= 17th Light Horse Regiment =

Australian Army mounted regiment

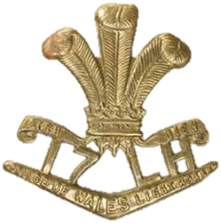
- 17th (Prince of Wales's) Light Horse cap badge
- Active: 1911–1943
- Disbanded: 13 February 1943
- Country: Australia
- Branch: Australian Light Horse
- Type: Cavalry
- Size: Regiment
- Part of: 5th Cavalry Brigade
- Garrison/HQ: Bendigo
- Motto(s): Loyalty
- Battle honours: ANZAC, Gallipoli 1915, Egypt 1915–17, Palestine 1917–18

Insignia
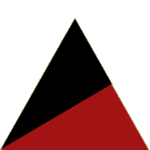
- Unit colour patch

The 17th Light Horse Regiment (Prince of Wale's Light Horse) was a Citizens Military Force (CMF) unit of the Australian Light Horse, formed during the 1912 reorganisation of the Australian Army. The regiment traces its origins back to the militia cavalry regiments raised in the colony of Victoria, such as the Royal Volunteer Cavalry Regiment, the Prince of Wales's Light Horse Hussars and the Sandhurst Cavalry Troop.

== History ==
The 19th Light Horse (Victorian Mounted Rifles) was formed in 1911 with its headquarters located at Bendigo and elements drawn from Elmore, Rochester, Echuca, Kerang, Pyramid Hill, Mitiamo, Castlemaine and Kyneton. Following the Federal re-organisation of 1912 the unit was retitled the 17th Light Horse (Victorian Mounted Rifles) and a year later as the 17th (Campaspe) Light Horse. During the First World War militia units were precluded from serving oversees, as a result of the Defence Act 1903, however many members of the 17th volunteered for service with the Australian Imperial Force.

Following the war the Australian Light Horse was again reorganised in 1921 and the 17th formed part of the 5th Cavalry Brigade of the 2nd Cavalry Division. This brigade also contained the 4th (Corangamite) Light Horse, 19th (Yarrowee) Light Horse as well as other supporting units. During the 1920s the Australian Light Horse converted from their pre-war mounted rifles role to that of cavalry modelled along British Army lines. In 1927 the 17th underwent another title change and was renamed as the 17th (Bendigo) Light Horse.

As a result of the financial pressures in the late 1920s, a number of light horse units were required to amalgamate. The 17th linked with the 19th Light Horse in 1929. The 19th Light Horse was not maintained during the period in which they were linked, with the new unit remaining in the former 17th Light Horse locations. In 1930 the unit was retitled again as the 17th (Prince of Wales’s) Light Horse. In 1933 the units were de-linked only for them to re-link the following year. In October 1936, the units were unlinked and the 17th became the 17th Light Horse (Machine Gun) Regiment (The Prince of Wales’s Light Horse). Along with the 1st Armoured Car Regiment, they formed the divisional troops of the 2nd Cavalry Division. As a machine gun regiment they provided fire support with Vickers Medium Machine Guns which were transported via civilian trucks.

When the Second World War broke out the CMF was mobilised for continuous training and home defence. During the early period of the war the unit conducted training with its parent division and many members volunteered to join the 2nd Australian Imperial Force. In March 1941 C Squadron of the regiment was provided to form the nucleus of the 4th Armoured Regiment. As part of the wider mechanisation of the Australian Light Horse, the unit was converted to the 17th Motor Regiment in March 1942. It would now provide a motorised infantry capability to the 1st Australian Armoured Division as part of its Support Group. Throughout late 1942 it participated in the divisional exercises in Narrabri. Over the course of November 1942 through February 1943 the unit was attached to the 2nd Australian Armoured Brigade and the 2nd Australian Motor Brigade.

However, by early 1943 the strategic threat to Australia from Japan had lessened, which meant that the need for large armoured formations to defend Australia had vanished. As a result, the 17th Motor Regiment was ordered to disband on 13 February 1942. Elements of A Squadron and B Squadron were transferred to the 20th Motor Regiment and C Squadron sent to reinforce the 15th Motor Regiment. Other unit members were transferred to the Australian Army Ordnance Corps as well as various units within the 1st Australian Armoured Division and 3rd Australian Armoured Division.

Following the Second World War, the Victorian light horse units of the 5th Cavalry Brigade were perpetuated through the 4th/19th Prince of Wales Light Horse Regiment, a unit of the Royal Australian Armoured Corps.
