= 5th Motor Brigade =

Formation of the Australian Army during World War II

- Active: 1921–1936; 1942
- Country: Australia
- Allegiance: Australian Crown
- Branch: Australian Army
- Type: Armoured
- Size: Brigade
- Part of: 2nd Cavalry Division; 2nd Motor Division

Insignia
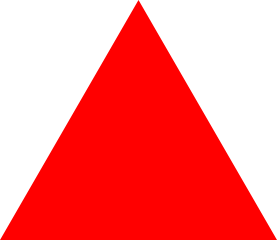
- Colour Patch

The 5th Motor Brigade was a formation of the Australian Army during the interwar years and World War II. A formation of the part-time Militia, the brigade was formed in 1921 as the 5th Cavalry Brigade. At this time, it consisted of three light horse regiments based in Victoria. The brigade ceased to exist in 1936 due to manpower shortages, but was re-raised during World War II, in April 1942, as a motor brigade. It was quickly disbanded, however, and was used to raise the 6th Armoured Brigade in June 1942, without having seen combat.

== History ==
The 5th Cavalry Brigade was raised as a formation of the part-time Militia in 1921. Forming part of the 2nd Cavalry Division, its headquarters was established in Melbourne, in Victoria. It consisted of three light horse regiments: the 4th, 17th and 19th Light Horse Regiments. These regiments were spread between Warrnambool (4th), Bendigo (17th) and Ballarat (19th), and were drawn from areas previously assigned to the 6th and 7th Light Horse Brigades, which had been disbanded when Australia's part-time mounted units were re-formed as cavalry brigades. At this time, the force was maintained using a mix of voluntary enlistment and compulsory service. The brigade ceased to exist in October 1936, due to manpower shortages following the suspension of the compulsory service scheme in the early 1930s. By 1938, the brigade's regiments had been reassigned to the 3rd Cavalry Brigade, with the 4th and 19th having been amalgamated, and the 17th having been converted into a machine gun regiment.

During the early part of World War II, the Australian Army undertook a modernisation program to motorise or mechanise its mounted forces, at which time many light horse regiments were issued vehicles and re-roled. As a result, the brigade was formed in April 1942 at Geelong, Victoria, as a motor brigade, tasked with the defence of Australia. Assigned to the 2nd Motor Division – which had been converted from the 2nd Cavalry Division – the brigade initially consisted of three motor regiments: the 13th, 17th and 104th. The brigade did not last long and in June 1942 its constituent units were absorbed into the 6th Armoured Brigade, and the brigade was disbanded without having seen combat.

== Brigade units ==
The following units served with the brigade as a cavalry formation:

- 4th Light Horse Regiment
- 17th Light Horse Regiment
- 19th Light Horse Regiment

The following units were assigned to the brigade as a motor formation:

- 13th Motor Regiment
- 17th Motor Regiment
- 104th Motor Regiment

== See also ==
- List of Australian Army brigades
