= 6th Cavalry Brigade (Australia) =

Formation of the Australian Army

6th Australian Cavalry Brigade
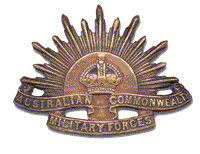
- Active: 1903–1942
- Country: Australia
- Allegiance: Australian
- Branch: Australian Light Horse
- Type: Mounted
- Role: Cavalry
- Size: Brigade
- Part of: 2nd Cavalry Division
- Garrison/HQ: South Australia
- Equipment: Horse

Insignia
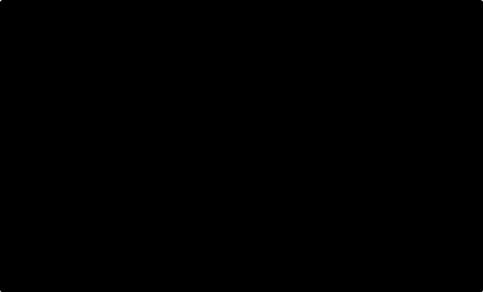
- Unit colour patch

The 6th Cavalry Brigade was a militia or Citizens Military Force (CMF) formation of the Australian Army based in South Australia. It originated from the 6th Light Horse Brigade and was later converted to the 6th Motor Brigade and eventually to the 6th Armoured Brigade. During World War II, the brigade undertook defensive garrison duties until its conversion to the armoured role in 1942. It did not see combat.

== History ==
The 6th Light Horse Brigade was formed in 1903 as part of the Federal reorganisation of the Australian Military. It originally included the 16th Australian Light Horse (South Australian Mounted Rifles), 17th Australian Light Horse (South Australian Mounted Rifles) and the 18th Australian Light Horse (Western Australian Mounted Infantry) as well as brigade troops such as artillery, engineers, medical and veterinary corps. Following the Kitchener Review, which led to the reorganisation of the military, it was re-numbered as 8th Light Horse Brigade in 1912. Its units became the 22nd, 23rd and 24th Light Horse. Its recruiting area remained South Australia. During the First World War as it was a militia element, and forbidden to serve outside Australian territory as per the 1903 Defence Act, the brigade was not part of the Australian Imperial Force mounted troops raised for service overseas.

Following the First World War the military was again reorganised in 1921. The 8th was renamed the 6th Cavalry Brigade and was headquartered at Keswick in Adelaide. It formed part of the 2nd Cavalry Division, spread across Victoria and South Australia. In South Australia in addition to the 6th were elements of the divisional troops such as an artillery battery, engineers, signals, field ambulance and service corps. Over the course of the 1920s and 1930s the evolution of Australia's mounted forces fell behind that of other countries who had begun converting their horse mounted cavalry to motorised (trucks) or mechanised (armoured fighting vehicles) forces. The paucity of funding, vehicles and modern equipment severely hindered the 6th Cavalry Brigades adoption of motorisation. However, by the late 1930s elements of the brigade had begun converting to truck borne machine gun regiments, such as the 18th Light Horse (Machine Gun) Regiment, or by raising ad hoc light car or scout troops. Likewise, due to financial stringencies, a number of its units were forced to amalgamate with regiments linking and unlinking in this period.

Upon the declaration of war in 1939, the brigade was placed on a war footing. The brigade and its units entered into a number of periods of continuous training to improve the standard of the soldiers' fitness, training and preparation for war. The bombing of Pearl Harbor in December 1941, the fall of Singapore on 15 February, the bombing of Darwin on 19 February 1942 and occupation of the Philippines and Dutch East Indies, fuelled concerns in Australia that the Japanese would continue their aggressive occupation of South East Asia through to the South Pacific. Consequently, the 6th was called up for full-time service in Australia. At this time, it consisted of the 3rd, 9th/23rd and 18th Light Horse Regiments. It was tasked with forming a district reserve, and defending positions along the Onkaparinga and Stuart Rivers, in South Australia. The 6th Cavalry Brigade became the 6th Motor Brigade in February 1942, and its subordinate units were also motorised. The brigade was converted to a mechanised formation, the 6th Armoured Brigade in May 1942 and transferred to the nascent Australian Armoured Corps.

== Brigade units ==
The 6th Cavalry Brigade's organisation from 1921 was:

- 6th Cavalry Brigade Headquarters, Adelaide
- 3rd Light Horse Regiment, from the south and east of the state headquartered at Mount Gambier
- 9th Light Horse Regiment, from the north of the state headquartered at Jamestown
- 23rd Light Horse Regiment, headquartered at Adelaide
- 18th Light Horse Regiment (Divisional Cavalry however was attached to the brigade for training) headquartered at Unley
- Field Artillery Battery
- Field Troop, Engineers
- Signal Troop
- Field Ambulance
- Veterinary Section
- Army Service Corps

== See also ==
- List of Australian Army brigades
