= 23rd Light Horse Regiment =

Australian Army mounted regiment

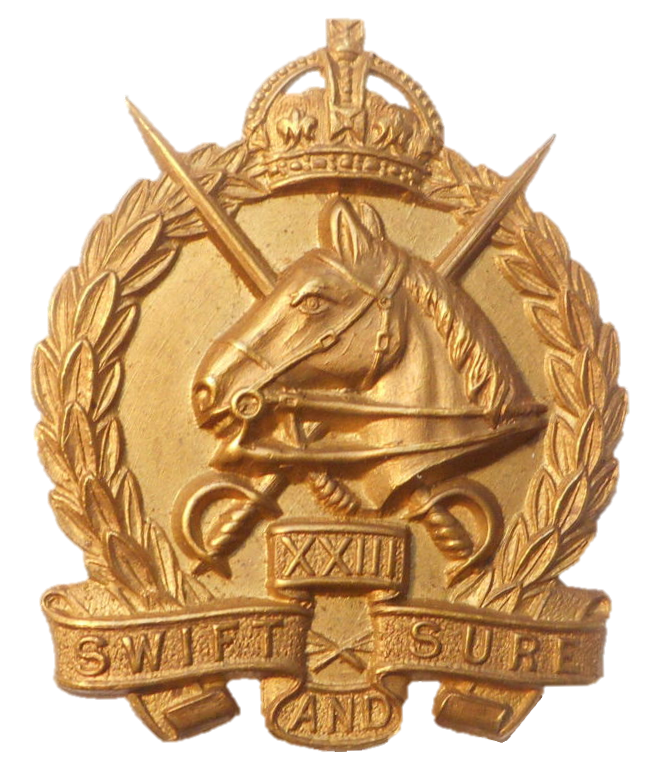
- 23rd Light Horse Regiment hat badge
- Active: 1912–1942
- Country: Australia
- Branch: Australian Light Horse
- Type: Mounted
- Role: Cavalry
- Size: Regiment
- Part of: 6th Cavalry Brigade
- Garrison/HQ: Barossa Valley
- Mottos: 'Swift and Sure'
- Battle honours: ANZAC, GALLIPOLI 1915, EGYPT 1915–1917, Palestine 1917–1918

Insignia
- Unit colour patch

The 23rd Light Horse Regiment (Barossa) was a Citizens Military Force (CMF) unit of the Australian Light Horse, formed during the 1912 reorganisation of the Australian Army. The regiment traces its origins back to the militia cavalry units raised in the colony of South Australia, specifically the South Australian Mounted Rifles.

== History ==
The 23rd Light Horse was formed in the 1912 reorganisation of the Australian Light Horse, following the Kitchener Review. As a result of this reorganisation, additional Light Horse Brigades and regiments were to be raised, resulting in a third regiment being raised in the South Australia. The 23rd was a new regiment which incorporated elements of the 16th Australian Light Horse (South Australian Mounted Rifles) and the 17th Australian Light Horse (South Australian Mounted Rifles). It comprised

- Headquarters and Signallers (formerly 17th Light Horse) Adelaide
- Machine Gun Section (17th Light Horse) Adelaide
- A Squadron (formerly No 1 Squadron, 16th Light Horse, 1st Squadron) located at Adelaide – Magill – Tea Tree Gully – Ashton – Lobethal – Gumeracha – Blumberg
- B Squadron located at North Adelaide – Walkerville – Prospect – Salisbury – Two Wells – Smithfield – Angle Vale – Gawler – Williamstown
- C Squadron located at Burra – Hamley Bridge – Riverton – Kapunda

In 1913 it adopted the territorial title of 23rd (Barossa) Light Horse in recognition of its major catchment area of the Barossa north of Adelaide.

During the First World War militia units were precluded from serving oversees, as a result of the Defence Act 1903; however, members of the 23rd volunteered for service with the Australian Imperial Force. In recognition of this service, the 23rd Light Horse was later awarded battle honours for ANZAC, Gallipoli, Egypt and Palestine.

Following the war the Australian Light Horse was again reorganised in 1921 and the 23rd formed part of the 6th Cavalry Brigade of the 2nd Cavalry Division. This brigade also contained the 3rd and 9th Light Horse Regiments as well as supporting troops. During the 1920s the Australian Light Horse converted from their pre-war mounted rifles role to that of cavalry modelled along British Army lines.

Due to the financial pressures that the Australian military was under, a number of light horse units were amalgamated in the late 1920s. The 18th and 23rd Light Horse Regiments were linked to form the 18th/23rd Light Horse Regiment in 1929. In 1936, the 18th and 23rd were unlinked; however, the 23rd was linked with the 9th Light Horse Regiment to form the 9th/23rd Light Horse Regiment.

When the Second World War broke out the CMF was mobilised for continuous training and home defence. During the early period of the war the unit conducted training with its parent division and many members volunteered to join the 2nd Australian Imperial Force. The 23rd was unlinked from the 9th on 1 December 1941. As part of the wider mechanisation of the Australian Light Horse, the unit was converted to a mechanised reconnaissance role and was retitled the 23rd Reconnaissance Company (Barossa Light Horse) at this time.

The Reconnaissance Company comprised

- Company Headquarters (58 personnel and 12 vehicles)
- Mortar Platoon comprising a headquarters and two mortar sections (21 personnel and 2 motorcycles, 4 x 15 cwt trucks and 2 x 3inch mortars)
- Infantry Platoon comprising a headquarters and four infantry sections (41 personnel and 6 x 15cwt trucks)
- Three Scout Platoons comprising a headquarters, armoured reconnaissance section and two carrier sections (39 personnel, 2 motorcycles, 5 reconnaissance cars and 7 tracked carriers)

In this role it was to serve as the reconnaissance force for the 4th Military District till March 1942. From this time it served as the brigade reconnaissance squadron for the 6th Motor Brigade, which had begun the process of motorisation in February.

However, when the 6th Motor Brigade was earmarked for conversion to an Armoured Brigade, the 9th Motor Regiment was designated its reconnaissance squadron. Consequently, this left 23rd Reconnaissance Company surplus to requirement and it was disbanded on 8 May 1942 without serving overseas.
