= 9th Light Horse Regiment (Australia) =

Military unit during the World Wars

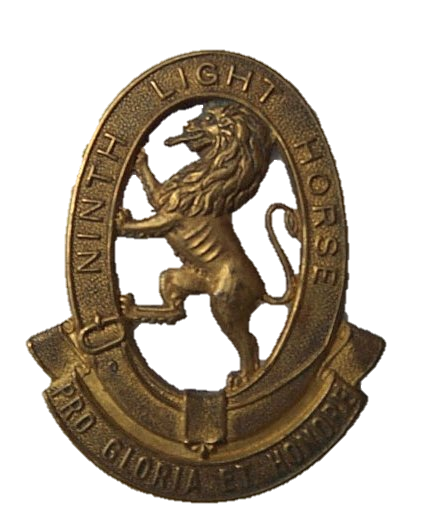
- 9th Light Horse hat badge
- Active: 1914–1919; 1921–1943
- Country: Australia
- Branch: Australian Army
- Type: Mounted infantry
- Size: Regiment
- Part of: 3rd Light Horse Brigade
- Engagements: First World War: North African Campaign; Gallipoli campaign; Sinai and Palestine Campaign

Insignia
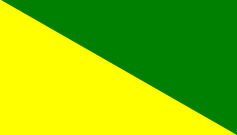
- Unit colour patch

The 9th Light Horse Regiment was a mounted rifles regiment of the Australian Army during the First World War. The regiment was raised in October 1914, and assigned to the 3rd Light Horse Brigade. The regiment fought against the forces of the Ottoman Empire, in Egypt, at Gallipoli, on the Sinai Peninsula, and in Palestine and Jordan. After the armistice the regiment eventually returned to Australia in March 1919. For its role in the war the regiment was awarded seventeen battle honours.

During the inter-war years, the regiment was re-raised as a part-time unit based in South Australia, adopting the designation of the "Flinders Light Horse". It was later amalgamated with the 23rd Light Horse to form the 9th/23rd Light Horse, but in late 1941 was re-formed in its own right and converted to a motor regiment during the early years of the Second World War but it was disbanded in early 1943 without having been deployed overseas. In the post war period, the regiment was re-raised as an amalgamated unit along with the 3rd Light Horse designated the 3rd/9th Light Horse (South Australian Mounted Rifles).

== Formation ==
The 9th Light Horse Regiment was raised at Adelaide and trained in Melbourne between October 1914 and February 1915. A unit of the all volunteer Australian Imperial Force, about two thirds of its recruits were from South Australia while the remainder came from Victoria. The regiment comprised twenty-five officers and 497 other ranks serving in three squadrons, each of six troops. Each troop was divided into eight sections of four men each. In action one man of each section, was nominated as a horse holder reducing the regiment's rifle strength by a quarter. Once formed the regiment was assigned to the 3rd Light Horse Brigade, serving alongside the 8th and 10th Light Horse Regiments.

All Australian Light Horse regiments used cavalry unit designations, but were mounted rifles armed with rifles, not swords or lances, and mounted exclusively on the Australian Waler horse.

== Operational history ==
=== Gallipoli campaign ===
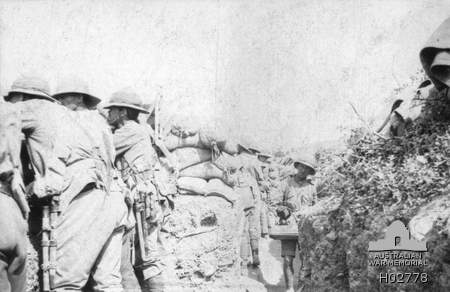
9th Light Horse trench Gallipoli

In February 1915, the 9th Light Horse Regiment left Melbourne for Egypt, arriving on the 1 February 1915. When the Australian infantry units were dispatched to Gallipoli, it was thought the terrain was unsuitable for mounted troops, and the light horse regiments remained in Egypt. However, heavy casualties resulted in the deployment of the 3rd Light Horse Brigade as reinforcements in May 1915. On arrival, the regiment was attached to the New Zealand and Australian Division. The regiment was the brigade reserve for the battle of the Nek, so did not suffer the same level of casualties as their sister regiments in the brigade, however their first commanding officer, Lieutenant Colonel Albert Miell, was one of those killed. The regiment was involved in the brigade's next attack at Hill 60 on 27 August, which resulted in the death of the replacement commanding officer Lieutenant Colonel Carew Reynell the next day. From then until December 1915, when the regiment was withdrawn, they were only used in a defensive role.

=== Sinai and Palestine campaign ===
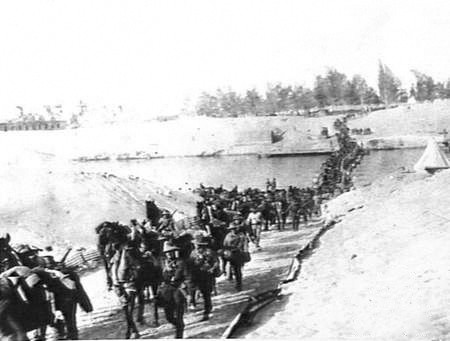
9th Light Horse crossing the Suez canal

On the regiment's return to Egypt, together with the 3rd Light Horse Brigade, they were assigned to the newly raised ANZAC Mounted Division. Used in the defence of the Suez Canal, the regiment provided the majority of the fighting troops for The Jifjafa Raid. They missed the early battles of the Sinai and Palestine campaign, but were involved in the pursuit of the Ottoman forces into Palestine, following their defeat in the Battle of Romani.

In December 1916, the regiment took part in a bayonet attack during the battle of Magdhaba, and another in the battle of Rafa in January 1917. The regiment and brigade were then assigned to a new division, the Imperial Mounted Division – which was later renamed the Australian Mounted Division – and subsequently fought in the unsuccessful First and Second Battles of Gaza.

The next Battle of Beersheba in October 1917, was a success, and led to the fall of Gaza. This led to a general withdrawal of Ottoman forces north into Palestine, followed by the British Empires forces. During this pursuit the regiment was involved in the capture of Jerusalem in December. In 1918, the regiment took part in an unsuccessful raid across the River Jordan at Es Salt. On 21 September, the regiment captured Jenin and Sa'sa', and entered Damascus in October. The war in the Middle East ended shortly afterwards when the armistice of Mudros was signed in October 1918. Afterwards, the regiment returned to Egypt to assist in putting down a revolt, before sailing for Australia in July 1919. The war cost the regiment over 100 per cent casualties, 190 killed and 481 wounded.

== Perpetuation ==
In 1921, Australia's part-time military forces were re-organised to perpetuate the numerical designations of the AIF following its demobilisation. Through this process, the 9th Light Horse was re-raised as a Citizens Forces unit within the 4th Military District in the state of South Australia, drawing lineage from the 24th Light Horse (Flinders), which had been formed in 1913 and which traced its origins back to the 17th Australian Light Horse Regiment that had been formed in 1903 as part of the amalgamation of Australia's colonial forces into the Australian Army after Federation.

Later, this unit was amalgamated with the 23rd Light Horse to form the 9th/23rd Light Horse, and at the outbreak of the war the regiment was assigned to the 6th Cavalry Brigade, which was part of the 1st Cavalry Division. In December 1941, the 9th was re-raised in its own right, comprising elements from the 9th/23rd Light Horse and converted into a motor regiment, adopting the designation of the "9th Motor Regiment (Flinders Light Horse)", while the remainder of the 9th/23rd were converted into two reconnaissance companies, designated as the 4th Military District Reconnaissance Company, and the 3rd Infantry Brigade Reconnaissance Company. The regiment was deemed surplus to requirements and, as part of a gradual demobilisation of the Australian Army, on 19 February 1943, it was disbanded without having seen operational service during the war.

In the post war period, Australia's part-time force was re-raised and in 1949 the regiment was reformed as an amalgamated unit with the 3rd Light Horse Regiment, adopting the designation of the 3rd/9th Light Horse (South Australian Mounted Rifles).

== Battle honours ==
The 9th Light Horse Regiment was awarded the following battle honours:

- ANZAC · Defence at ANZAC · Suvla · Sari Bair · Gallipoli 1915–1916 · Egypt 1915–1917 · Romani · Magdhaba-Rafah · Gaza-Beersheba · El Mughar · Nebi Samwill · Jerusalem · Jordan (Es Salt) · Megiddo · Sharon · Palestine 1917–1918 · Capture of Damascus (1918).

== Commanding officers ==
The following officers commanded the 9th Light Horse Regiment during the First World War:

- Lieutenant Colonel Albert Miell (KIA)
- Lieutenant Colonel Carew Reynell (KIA)
- Lieutenant Colonel William Grant DSO
- Lieutenant Colonel John McLean Arnott CMG
- Lieutenant Colonel William Henry Scott CMG, DSO & Bar
- Lieutenant Colonel Thomas Joseph Daly DSO
