= 13th Light Horse Regiment (Australia) =

Mounted regiment of the Australian Army

- 13th Light Horse Regiment hat badge
- Active: 1915–1919; 1921–1943
- Country: Australia
- Branch: Australian Army
- Type: Mounted infantry
- Size: Regiment
- Part of: Australian Corps
- Nickname(s): "Devils Own"
- Engagements: First World War: Gallipoli campaign; Sinai and Palestine Campaign; Western Front

Insignia
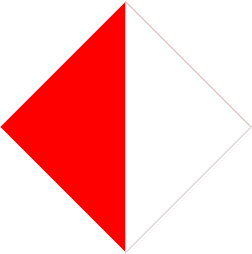
- Unit colour patch

The 13th Light Horse Regiment was a mounted infantry regiment of the Australian Army during the First World War. The regiment was raised in March 1915, and eventually assigned as the mounted regiment for the Australian Corps. During the war the regiment fought against the forces of the Ottoman Empire, at Gallipoli, and against the German Empire on the Western Front. For its role in the war the regiment was awarded twelve battle honours. In 1921, it was later re-raised as a part-time unit of the Citizens Forces, and was briefly amalgamated with the 19th Light Horse. During the Second World War, the regiment was converted into an armoured regiment, designated the "13th Armoured Regiment", although it was disbanded in late 1943 without seeing action.

== Formation ==
The 13th Light Horse Regiment was raised in Victoria in March 1915. Being the thirteenth regiment raised within the Australian Imperial Force (AIF) they were soon given the nickname the "Devil's Own" regiment, and comprised twenty-five officers and 497 other ranks serving in three squadrons, each of six troops. Each troop was divided into eight sections, of four men each. In action one man of each section, was nominated as a horse holder reducing the regiment's rifle strength by a quarter.

All Australian Light Horse regiments used cavalry unit designations, but were mounted infantry armed with rifles, not swords or lances, and mounted exclusively on the Australian Waler horse.

== Operational history ==
=== Gallipoli Campaign ===
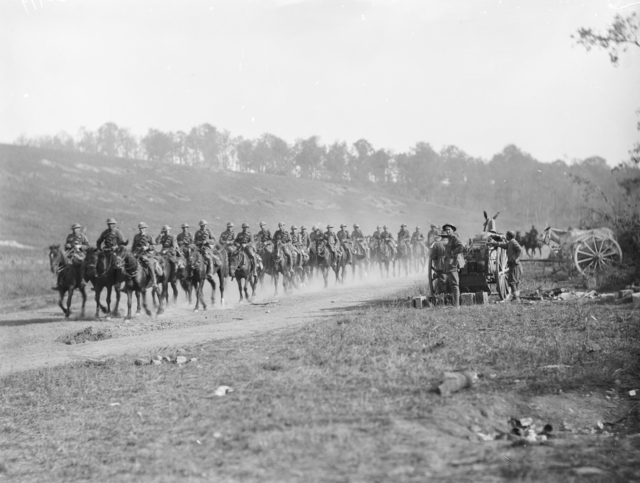
13th Light Horse Regiment, moving up past Gressaire Wood to participate in the attack that morning near Bray by the 9th Infantry Brigade.

In May 1915, the 13th Light Horse Regiment left Australia for the Middle East, arriving in Egypt in June. When the Australian infantry units had been dispatched to Gallipoli earlier that year, it was thought the terrain was unsuitable for mounted troops, and the light horse regiments had remained in Egypt. However, heavy casualties resulted in their deployment in May and the 13th Light Horse Regiment in turn was sent into battle in September 1915 in a dismounted role. The regiment was deployed defending the trenches at Lone Pine, a strongly contested stretch of the front line around Anzac Cove. Two months later in December, the regiment was withdrawn back to Egypt when the Allied forces were evacuated from the peninsula.

=== Western Front ===
Two squadrons – "B" and "D" – which had originally been part of the 4th Light Horse Regiment took part in the Battle of Messines, the Third Battle of Ypres, the Battle of Broodseinde, the Battle of Passchendaele, the Battle of the Lys, the Battle of Kemmel, the Second Battle of the Marne and the Battle of Tardenois. The two squadrons, together with a squadron from New Zealand, were eventually amalgamated and renamed the II Anzac Corps Mounted Regiment, (Note: The II ANZAC Mounted Regiment was formed in July 1916 from 'B' and 'D' Squadrons, 4th Light Horse Regiment and a squadron of the New Zealand Otago Mounted Rifles Regiment and assigned to II Anzac Corps. Following the formation of the Australian Corps the Regiment remained with the redesignated XXII Corps to form the XXII Mounted Regiment. It was the only element of AIF ground combat forces in France not to see action with the Australian Corps. It was disbanded in December 1918 and its personnel transferred to the 13th Light Horse Regiment.) and together earned nine battle honours on the Western Front.

When the infantry component of the Australian Imperial Force was expanded to five divisions, the 13th Light Horse Regiment was broken up to provide a reconnaissance squadron for the 2nd, 4th, and 5th Divisions. The squadrons then moved to the Western Front in France between March and June 1916. They were soon reunited, however, as the "I ANZAC Mounted Regiment".

The static nature of the fighting along the Western Front limited the use of mounted troops and they were mostly in a secondary role; doing traffic control, rear area security, escorting prisoners and during an attack reconnaissance and probing the German rear areas. The pinnacle of the regiment's service on the Western Front was following the Hundred Days Offensive when they led the advance of the Australian Corps. When the war ended the regiment was resting, and gradually its personnel were returned to Australia. Their total casualties during the war were 57 killed, and 328 wounded.

== Perpetuation ==
In 1921, Australia's part-time military forces were re-organised to perpetuate the numerical designations of the AIF following its demobilisation. Through this process, the 13th Light Horse was re-raised as a Citizens Forces unit in Victoria, adopting the territorial designation of the "Gippsland Light Horse". In 1939, the regiment was amalgamated with the 19th Light Horse to become the 13th/19th Light Horse.

In August 1940, during the opening stages of the Second World War, the 13th was re-formed in its own right. It was later mechanised and re-designated the "13th Motor Regiment" in March 1942, based at Gherang, Victoria. In May that year, it was converted into an armoured regiment – designated as the "13th Armoured Regiment" – as part of the 2nd Armoured Division's 6th Armoured Brigade, which had been formed for defensive duties to guard against a possible invasion of mainland Australia. After moving to Puckapunyal in July, the regiment was equipped with M3 Grant tanks. Further training was undertaken in Murgon, Queensland, throughout 1943. By that time, manpower within the Army was scarce and as the threat of an invasion by the Japanese diminished during the year, so too did the need for large-scale armoured forces. A number of armoured units were subsequently disbanded as men and equipment were reallocated as the Army reorganised for jungle warfare. As a result, the 13th was disbanded in October 1943. In the post war period, the unit was perpetuated by the 8th/13th Victorian Mounted Rifles, which existed between 1948 and 1991–92.

== Battle honours ==
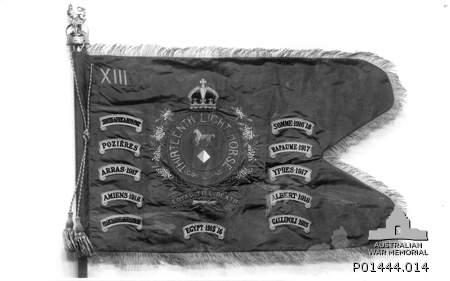
The 13th Light Horse Regiment's guidon bearing their battle honours

Gallipoli 1915 · Egypt 1915–17 · Somme 1916 · Somme 1918 · Pozières · Bapaume 1917 · Arras 1917 · Ypres 1917 · Albert 1918 · France and Flanders 1916–18 · Amiens 1918 (Note: The 13th Light Horse Regiment was awarded the battle honour "Amiens 1918" in 1927. This appears to be unique, with all other British and Dominion units involved in the battle receiving the honour "Amiens".)

== Commanding officers ==
- Lieutenant Colonel George Henry Dean VD
- Lieutenant Colonel John McLean Arnott CMG
- Lieutenant Colonel Ernest Morgan Williams DSO
- Lieutenant Colonel Dudley Persee White
- Major Alexander Mitchell DSO
- Lieutenant Colonel Stanley George Hindhaugh DSO
