= 2nd Armoured Division (Australia) =

1942–1943 armoured formation of the Australian Army

Australian 2nd Armoured Division
- 2nd Australian Armoured Division formation sign
- Active: 1921–1943
- Country: Australia
- Branch: Australian Armoured Corps
- Type: Armoured
- Garrison/HQ: Geelong
- Battle honours: None

Commanders
- Notable commanders: William Locke

Insignia
- Unit colour patch

The 2nd Armoured Division was an armoured formation of the Australian Army during World War II. Originally raised in 1921 as the 2nd Cavalry Division, based in Victoria and South Australia, the formation had been converted into a motor division in early 1942, before adopting the armoured designation later in the year. A Militia formation, the division undertook garrison duties in Australia and did not see combat before being disbanded in mid-1943.

== History ==
The division was established in 1921 as the 2nd Cavalry Division, which was formed as part of the Militia when Australia's part time military force was re-established following the demobilisation of its wartime forces. Based in Victoria and South Australia, the division consisted of the 3rd, 5th and 6th Cavalry Brigades. The 5th Cavalry Brigade was disbanded during the interwar years, and by the outbreak of the war, the divisional headquarters was located in south Geelong. Tasked with the defence of the western approaches to Melbourne in the event of an invasion, the division was called up for full time service in December 1941, following Japan's entry into the war. Its constituent units – the 4th and 20th Motor Regiments– were spread out between Stoneyford and Torquay and were organised into two ad hoc formations: Torquay Force and Corangmite Force. At the same time, the 3rd Cavalry Brigade was in reserve around Geelong. In early 1942, the 4th Infantry Division took over the forward defensive role, and the 2nd Cavalry Division became the commander's reserve, with its main elements concentrating around Lysterfield.

In March 1942, the division was redesignated as the 2nd Motor Division, with its headquarters based at Oakleigh, and support troops at Gherang. The 6th Motor Brigade (previously the 6th Cavalry Brigade) moved from Adelaide in May and came under the division's command again, based around Geelong, until June when they were reorganised as the 6th Armoured Brigade, taking personnel and equipment from the 5th Motor Brigade. While the 3rd Motor Brigade moved to Rowville, the 6th Armoured Brigade was sent to Puckapunyal in July for training and the division headquarters moved to Rokeby in August, around which time it was re-designated as the 2nd Armoured Division.

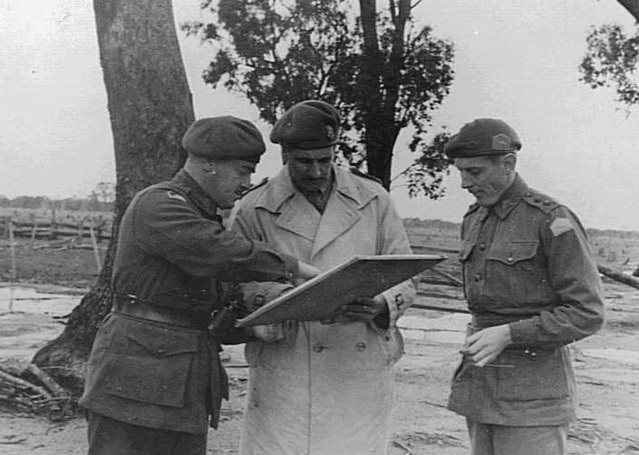
2nd Armoured Division officers at Puckapunyal

As an armoured division, it consisted of one armoured brigade of three armoured regiments, and one motor brigade consisting of three motor regiments, supported by an armoured car regiment. Its armoured regiments were equipped with M3 Grant medium tanks and M3 Stuart light tanks. A major restructure of the Army's armoured formations occurred in October 1942, at which time the 3rd Motor Brigade was reassigned to the 1st Armoured Division, and sent to Western Australia for garrison duties, while several motor brigades from the 1st were sent to Gherang to become part of the 2nd Armoured Division. In mid-February 1943, while around Rokeby, the division reported its strength as 466 officers and 7,315 other ranks, which was the division's peak strength before it began disbanding.

As the threat of invasion passed, and the focus of the Army's attention turned to jungle warfare, the role of the Army's three armoured divisions diminished throughout 1943. By this time, there was a manpower shortage, which required a re-allocation of personnel and the gradual reduction of Australia's armoured units. As a result, the 2nd Armoured Division began the process of disbanding on 19 February 1943, although this was not completed until late May / early April when its headquarters was finally closed at Seymour and its staff marched out to join other units. The headquarters of its 6th Armoured Brigade was retained and redesignated as the headquarters of the 4th Armoured Brigade, moving to Singleton to begin preparing troops for deployment to New Guinea where they would join the fighting against the Japanese. The 2nd Armoured Division was commanded by Major General William Locke throughout its brief existence.

== Composition ==
=== Order of battle upon formation ===
Upon establishment as an armoured formation, the division consisted of:

- Divisional Headquarters
- 6th Armoured Car Regiment
- 2nd Armoured Divisional Signals
- 6th Armoured Brigade
  - 12th Armoured Regiment
  - 13th Armoured Regiment
  - 14th Armoured Regiment
  - 9th Motor Regiment
  - 3rd Armoured Reconnaissance Squadron
- 3rd Motor Brigade
  - 4th Motor Regiment
  - 26th Motor Regiment
  - 101st Motor Regiment
- Divisional Engineers
- Divisional Artillery
  - 22nd Field Regiment, Royal Australian Artillery
  - 105th Anti-Tank Regiment, Royal Australian Artillery
- Divisional Service and Administration Troops

=== Order of battle upon disbandment ===
At the time of its disbandment, the 2nd Armoured Division consisted of:

- Divisional Headquarters
- 6th Armoured Car Regiment
- 2nd Armoured Divisional Signals
- 6th Armoured Brigade
  - 12th Armoured Regiment
  - 13th Armoured Regiment
  - 14th Armoured Regiment
  - 9th Motor Regiment
  - 3rd Armoured Reconnaissance Squadron
- 2nd Motor Brigade
  - 15th Motor Regiment
  - 17th Motor Regiment
  - 20th Motor Regiment
- Divisional Engineers
- Divisional Artillery
  - 22nd Field Regiment, Royal Australian Artillery
  - 105th Anti-Tank Regiment, Royal Australian Artillery
- Divisional Service and Administration Troops

== See also ==
- Australian armoured units of World War II
