= List of Australian armoured units =

This is a list of all of the armoured units formed by the Australian Army

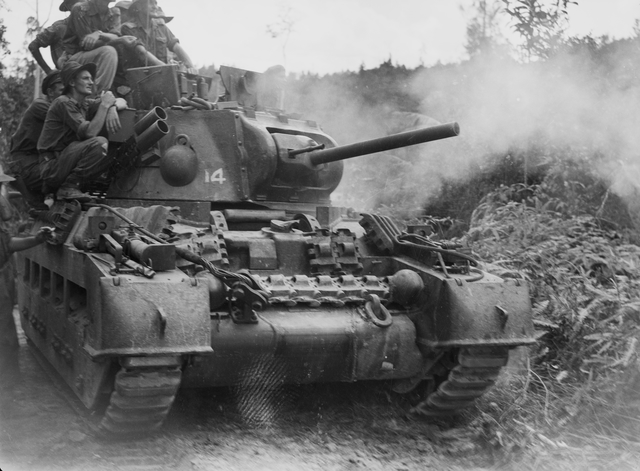
Australian howitzer-equipped Matilda tank in combat at the Battle of Tarakan

== Historic units ==
=== World War I ===
- 1st Light Car Patrol

=== Interwar ===
- 1st Tank Section
- 1st Light Tank Company
- 2nd Light Tank Company
- 1st Armoured Car Regiment
- 2nd Armoured Car Regiment

=== World War II ===
==== Divisions ====
- 1st Armoured Division
- 2nd Armoured Division
- 3rd Armoured Division

==== Brigades ====
- 1st Armoured Brigade
- 2nd Armoured Brigade
- 3rd Army Tank Brigade
- 4th Armoured Brigade
- 6th Armoured Brigade

==== Armoured reconnaissance regiments ====
- 6th Armoured Car Regiment
- 2/11th Armoured Car Regiment
- 12th Armoured Car Regiment
- 6th Division Cavalry Regiment
- 7th Division Cavalry Regiment
- 9th Division Cavalry Regiment
- 2nd Cavalry Regiment
- 8th Cavalry Regiment
- 21st Cavalry Regiment
- 25th Cavalry Regiment

==== Armoured regiments and tank battalions ====
- 2/4th Armoured Regiment
- 2/5th Armoured Regiment
- 2/6th Armoured Regiment
- 2/7th Armoured Regiment
- 2/8th Armoured Regiment
- 2/9th Armoured Regiment
- 2/10th Armoured Regiment
- 12th Armoured Regiment
- 13th Armoured Regiment
- 14th Armoured Regiment
- 1st Army Tank Battalion
- 2nd Army Tank Battalion
- 3rd Army Tank Battalion

==== Independent squadrons ====
- 2/1st Light Tank Squadron
- 2/2nd Light Tank Squadron
- 3rd Armoured Brigade Reconnaissance Squadron
- 2/1st Reconnaissance Squadron
- 2/1st Amphibious Armoured Squadron

==== Jungle division carrier companies ====
- 3rd Division Carrier Company
- 5th Division Carrier Company
- 6th Division Carrier Company
- 7th Division Carrier Company
- 9th Division Carrier Company
- 11th Division Carrier Company

=== Post-World War II ===
==== Australian Regular Army units ====
- 1st Armoured Car Squadron
- 3rd Cavalry Regiment
- 4th Cavalry Regiment
- 1st Armoured Personnel Carrier Squadron
- Medium Tank Trials Unit
- School of Armour

==== Citizen Military Forces/Army Reserve units ====
- 1st Armoured Brigade
- 2nd Armoured Brigade
- 1st Royal New South Wales Lancers
- 7th/21st Reconnaissance Regiment
- 8th/13th Victorian Mounted Rifles
- 6th New South Wales Mounted Rifles
- 15th Northern River Lancers

== Current units ==
=== Australian Regular Army ===
- 1st Armoured Regiment
- 2nd Cavalry Regiment
- 3rd/4th Cavalry Regiment
- 2nd/14th Light Horse Regiment (Queensland Mounted Infantry)

=== Army Reserve ===
- 1st/15th Royal New South Wales Lancers
- 3rd/9th Light Horse (South Australian Mounted Rifles)
- 4th/19th Prince of Wales's Light Horse
- 10th Light Horse Regiment
- 12th/16th Hunter River Lancers
