= Australian armoured units of World War II =

Australian Army during WW2

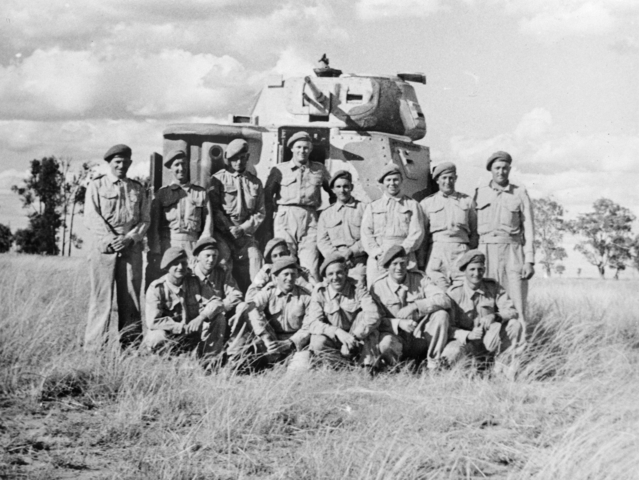
Members of the 2/4th Armoured Regiment with a M3 Grant tank in 1942

Armoured units made a relatively small, but important, contribution to Australia’s war effort during World War II. While Australia formed three armoured divisions and two independent armoured brigades during the war, Australian armoured units only saw action as independent regiments and companies supporting larger infantry formations. Early actions were fought in the Middle East by the divisional carrier regiments that supported the 6th, 7th and 9th Divisions, fighting in Libya, Egypt and Syria in 1941–42, before the Australian divisions returned to Australia in 1942–43. During the early fighting in the Pacific, there was a limited role for armoured formations, although one armoured regiment – the 2/6th – took part in the fighting around Buna–Gona in late 1942. Later in the war, though, during the Huon Peninsula, Bougainville and Borneo campaigns of 1943–45, several armoured units were used by Australian forces in the infantry support role.

== Pre-war ==
The Australian Army formed its first armoured units in the late 1920s when two independent Tank Sections equipped with Vickers Medium tanks were formed in New South Wales and Victoria. An armoured car regiment was formed in 1933 based on part of the 19th Light Horse Regiment (the remaining part of the 19th later became a machine-gun regiment), adopting the designation of the 1st Armoured Car Regiment. A second armoured car regiment, designated the 2nd Armoured Car Regiment, was formed in Sydney in 1939. Both of these units were later converted into different roles: the 1st becoming the 101st Motor Regiment, and the 2nd becoming the 2nd Armoured Regiment, and then later the 2nd Army Tank Battalion. As with the rest of the Australian Army, the outbreak of war in 1939 led to a dramatic expansion of Australia’s armoured force. Each of the four divisions in the Second Australian Imperial Force (AIF) was authorised a cavalry reconnaissance regiment equipped with light tanks and scout carriers.

== Divisional cavalry regiments ==
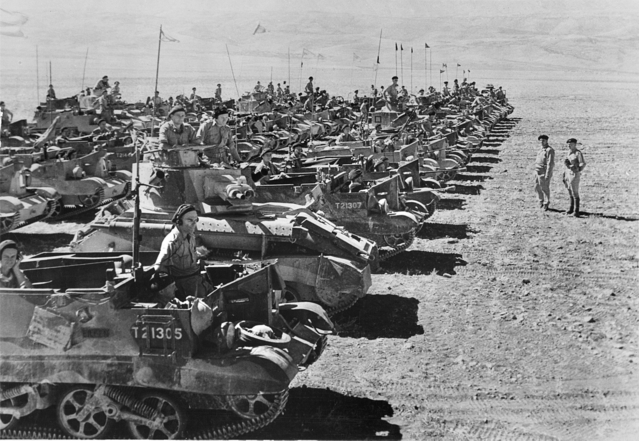
Tanks and carriers of the 9th Divisional Cavalry Regiment in Syria in 1941 (AWM 041776)

Until the formation of the 1st Armoured division, the three AIF divisional cavalry regiments were Australia’s only armoured units. While all four AIF divisions were authorised a divisional cavalry regiment, only three regiments were eventually formed as it was wrongly believed that the 8th Division did not need armoured support in Malaya. The three AIF divisional cavalry regiments were:

- 6th Divisional Cavalry Regiment
- 7th Divisional Cavalry Regiment
- 9th Divisional Cavalry Regiment (initially formed as 8th Divisional Cavalry Regiment)

These units saw action in the Middle East – fighting against the Italians in Libya, the Vichy French in Syria, and the Germans in Egypt – with their parent formations between 1941 and 1942, before returning to Australia in 1942–43.

In December 1941, four militia light horse regiments were converted to form divisional reconnaissance battalions. These battalions were re-designated as cavalry regiments in late 1942. The four units were:

- 2nd Reconnaissance Battalion (ex 2nd Light Horse Regiment)
- 8th Reconnaissance Battalion (ex 8th Light Horse Regiment)
- 21st Reconnaissance Battalion (ex 21st Light Horse Regiment)
- 25th Reconnaissance Battalion (ex 25th Light Horse Regiment)

The organisation of a divisional cavalry regiment was:

- Regimental Headquarters (4 light tanks, 2 carriers)
- Administration Squadron
- Three Fighting Squadrons each with:
  - One Squadron Headquarters (2 light tanks, 2 universal carriers)
  - Two light tank troops (each with 3 light tanks)
  - Three carrier troops (each with 3 carriers)

In early 1943, the three remaining AIF divisions – the 6th, 7th and 9th – and three of the militia divisions – the 3rd, 5th and 11th – were converted from motorised infantry to light infantry "Jungle Divisions". As part of this conversion, the AIF divisional cavalry regiments were re-formed as unarmoured commando regiments with the regimental headquarters commanding previously independent commando companies. The 3rd and 5th Divisions' cavalry regiments were both disbanded: the 21st Cavalry Regiment, which was assigned to the 3rd Division, was disbanded in May 1943, while the 2nd Cavalry Regiment, which was assigned to the 5th Division, was disbanded in July 1943. Many of the divisional cavalry regiments' officers and non-commissioned officers were transferred to other armoured units when their original unit converted to the commando role.

== Carrier platoons and companies ==
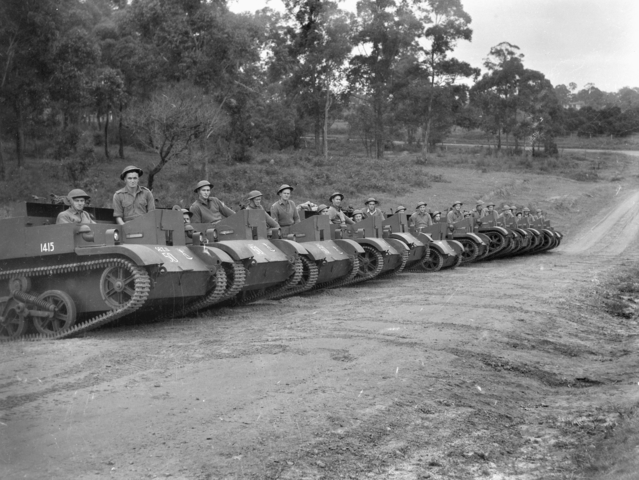
The 13/33rd Australian Infantry Battalion's Carrier Platoon at Sydney in 1943 (AWM 053617)

During the early years of the war all Australian infantry battalions were authorised a platoon of Universal Carriers. The carrier platoons' main roles were to transport the battalion's crew served weapons and conduct reconnaissance. The carriers were also occasionally used to transport infantry.

Experience in New Guinea in 1942, particularly around Buna–Gona demonstrated that, like almost all vehicles, the Universal Carrier was ill-suited to the dense jungle terrain common throughout the south-west Pacific. As a result, when the Australian Army restructured its six front-line infantry divisions as Jungle Divisions in 1943 the infantry battalion carrier platoons were disbanded and replaced by a single divisional carrier company. The divisions which were retained on the British-pattern organisation retained their battalion carrier platoons. Due to the Universal Carrier's vulnerability in jungle terrain the divisional carrier companies were mainly used to transport supplies to forward positions and to provide defence for the division's rear areas, although there were some examples of them being used for patrol work in New Guinea. For example, in April 1944, after being ferried into position by several aircraft, a platoon from the 11th Division's carrier company clashed with an isolated group of Japanese around Wantoat during the advance towards Madang.

Universal Carriers were also issued to anti-tank and armoured regiments during the war. Several anti-tank regiments were issued with 2 pounder guns mounted on modified Australian-built Universal Carriers, while standard Universal Carriers were issued to the Army's armoured regiments in 1941 and early 1942 for training purposes and to provide the Army with a minimal armoured capability until the arrival of large numbers of M3 Grant and M3 Stuart tanks in April 1942.

== Armoured divisions and brigades ==
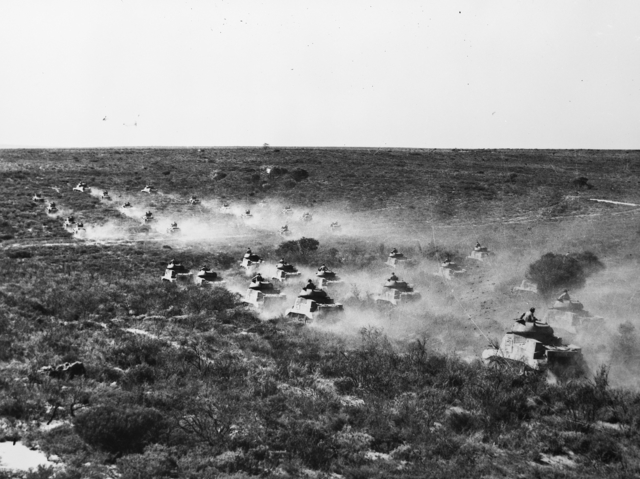
The 2/10th Armoured Regiment during a training exercise in Western Australia in 1943 (AWM 043801)

The 1st Armoured Division was formed in July 1941. Following the outbreak of hostilities with Japan a further two armoured divisions and two independent armoured brigades were formed, with the two new divisions converted from existing motor divisions:

- 2nd Armoured Division
- 3rd Armoured Division
- 3rd Army Tank Brigade
- 4th Armoured Brigade

One of the division's regiments, the 2/6th, was deployed to New Guinea in September 1942, where it fought during the Battle of Buna–Gona in late 1942 and early 1943. Other than this deployment, the rest of the division remained in Australia and in July 1943 it moved to Western Australia, while the 2nd Armoured Division was disbanded, the 3rd Armoured Division was concentrated in Queensland and the 3rd Army Tank Brigade remained in New South Wales. Meanwhile, as the threat of invasion passed the need for large armoured formations had lessened, and the divisions had been broken up between mid-1943 and 1944 with only one operational brigade remaining by the end of the war.

Following the disbandment of the 1st Armoured Division in September 1943 the division's 1st Armoured Brigade survived as an independent brigade group until it was also disbanded in September 1944. Armoured support for the jungle divisions was provided, when required, by elements of the 4th Armoured Brigade.

=== Armoured regiments and battalions ===
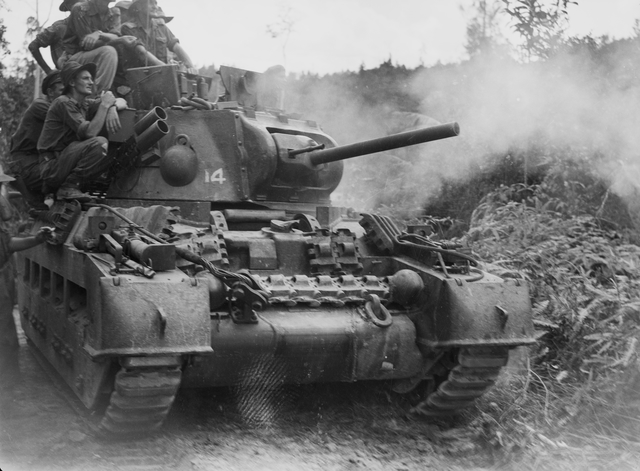
Australian howitzer-equipped Matilda II tank in combat at the Battle of Tarakan

Upon its formation the 1st Armoured Division was organised along British lines and was authorised six armoured regiments and an armoured car regiment. While these regiments began forming in mid-1941 they were not issued with any tanks as it was planned to equip the division and finalise its training when it deployed to the Middle East between December 1941 and March 1942. Following the outbreak of war in the Pacific the decision was made to retain the division in Australia. At this stage, there were still not enough tanks available to complete the division's equipment requirements, and so as an interim solution the division's armoured regiments were equipped with Bren Carriers until sufficient tanks arrived. These were replaced by newly arrived M3 Grant medium tanks in April and May 1942, and the division completed its training in northern New South Wales, before moving to Western Australia in 1943 where it was tasked with defending against a possible Japanese invasion.

The Australian Armoured Corps was expanded in early 1942, with the conversion of the 2nd Motor Division to the 2nd Armoured Division. This conversion involved three motorised regiments being armoured with M3 Grants and a further motorised regiments being converted into armoured reconnaissance regiments. In addition, the 3rd Army Tank Brigade was formed by converting the 4th Cavalry Brigade, to provide armoured support to infantry units. In keeping with this role, the brigade's three tank battalions were equipped with Matilda II infantry tanks, which were considered to have superior performance in jungle terrain; as a result, all of the armoured units to be deployed to the South West Pacific after the initial deployment of M3s as part of the detachment sent to Buna–Gona, were equipped with Matildas before deployment, and they were subsequently used in the Huon Peninsula, Bougainville and Borneo campaigns.

While a third armoured division was formed in late 1942 by converting the 1st Motor Division, this only resulted in the formation of one additional armoured reconnaissance unit as the 1st Armoured Division's 2nd Armoured Brigade was assigned to the new division and provided its armoured units.

== Independent squadrons ==
In October 1941, two independent light tank squadrons had been formed for service in Malaya; however, neither was deployed. They had been due to deploy in January 1942, yet this was cancelled due to a lack of vehicles in Australia or Malaya to equip them. In April 1942, the squadrons were redesigned as the 2/1st and 2/2nd Armoured Brigade Reconnaissance Squadrons, before being amalgamated in November 1942 with a squadron from the 2/11th Armoured Car Regiment to provide men for the new 2/4th Armoured Regiment. In September 1943, the 2/1st Armoured Brigade Reconnaissance Squadron was reformed using personnel from Headquarters Squadron, 1st Armoured Division following its disbandment. Meanwhile, the 3rd Armoured Brigade Reconnaissance Squadron was formed in South Australia in 1942 as part of the 6th Armoured Brigade from men drawn form the 3rd Motor Regiment. Later, a number of specialist units were formed. These included the Armoured Squadron (Special Equipment) raised in late 1944 which operated a number of Matilda tank dozers, Matilda Frog flamethrower tanks and a Coventanter bridge-layer, and the 2/1st Amphibious Armoured Squadron formed in 1945.

== Casualties ==
Due to the nature of their employment, casualties among Australian armoured units during World War II were limited in comparison with the infantry. In total, the three divisional cavalry regiments sustained 82 men killed or died of wounds, while the armoured regiments lost another 36 men.

== Summary list of Australian armoured units ==
Unit Name	Formed	Disbanded	Notes
Armoured Divisions
1st Armoured Division	July 1941	September 1943	Formed as an AIF Division
2nd Armoured Division	February 1942	February 1943	Previously 2nd Cavalry Division and 2nd Motor Division
3rd Armoured Division	November 1942	October 1943	Previously 1st Cavalry Division and 1st Motor Division
Armoured Brigades
1st Armoured Brigade	July 1941	September 1944	Independent brigade group from September 1943 to September 1944
2nd Armoured Brigade	July 1941	October 1943	Transferred from 1st Armoured Division to 3rd Armoured Division in November 1942
3rd Army Tank Brigade	May 1942	September 1943	
4th Armoured Brigade	January 1943	End of war	Brigade HQ previously 6th Armoured Brigade HQ
6th Armoured Brigade	February 1942	February 1943	Previously 6th Australian Cavalry Brigade and 6th Motor Brigade. HQ to 4th Armoured Brigade upon disbandment.
Armoured Car Regiments
1st Armoured Car Regiment	Late 1933		Converted to 1st Motor Regiment in 1941, later 1st Army Tank Battalion
2nd Armoured Car Regiment	March 1939		Converted to 2nd Army Tank battalion in 1942
6th Armoured Car Regiment	December 1941	February 1943	Previously the 6th Light Horse Regiment, and then converted into a motor regiment in 1941. In September 1942, it became an armoured car regiment, but it may never have completed its conversion from a motor regiment before being disbanded.
2/11th Armoured Car Regiment	August 1941	April 1944	
12th Armoured Car Regiment	March 1942	October 1943	Previously the 12th Light Horse Regiment and 12th Motor Regiment
Divisional Cavalry and Reconnaissance Regiments
6th Divisional Cavalry Regiment	November 1939		Converted to the 2/6th Commando Regiment in early 1943
7th Divisional Cavalry Regiment	May 1940		Converted to infantry in late 1942 and to 2/7th Commando Regiment in April 1943
9th Divisional Cavalry Regiment	July 1940		Formed as 8th Divisional Cavalry Regiment. Converted to the 2/9th Commando Regiment in December 1943
2nd Reconnaissance Battalion	December 1941	July 1943	Militia unit, previously the 2nd Moreton Light Horse. Later renamed 2nd Cavalry Regiment. This unit was the 5th Division's reconnaissance battalion in mid-1942.
8th Reconnaissance Battalion	December 1941	March 1944	Militia unit. This unit was the 3rd Division's reconnaissance battalion. Renamed 8th Cavalry Regiment in late 1942.
10th Light Horse Regiment	January 1942	December 1943	Militia unit. Named 10th Reconnaissance Battalion between 1940 and 1942. It is, however, if unclear if this unit was even partially armoured. Patrolled the Bunbury to Lancelin area of Western Australia on horseback. It formed part of the Australian III Corps troops in early 1943.
21st Reconnaissance Battalion	December 1941	May 1943	Militia unit, previously the 21st Light Horse Regiment. Renamed 21st Cavalry Regiment in September 1942. As an armoured unit this battalion served under a number of divisions. Upon disbandment the regiment's personnel were used to form a number of carrier companies and platoons.
25th Cavalry Regiment	July 1942	October 1943	Militia regiment that was formed from the 25th Light Horse. This unit was the 4th Division's divisional cavalry regiment in late 1942.
Armoured Regiments
2/4th Armoured Regiment	October 1942	End of war	Formed from 2/1st and 2/2nd Light Tank Squadrons and D Squadron, 2/11th Armoured Car Regiment
2/5th Armoured Regiment	July 1941	End of war	
2/6th Armoured Regiment	August 1941	End of war	
2/7th Armoured Regiment	August 1941	October 1944	
2/8th Armoured Regiment	July 1941	February 1944	Converted to the 41st, 42nd and 43rd Landing Craft Companies upon disbandment
2/9th Armoured Regiment	August 1941	End of war	
2/10th Armoured Regiment	July 1941	September 1944	
12th Armoured Regiment	May 1942	February 1943	Previously 18th Light Horse Regiment and 18th Motor Regiment
13th Armoured Regiment	May 1942	October 1943	Previously 13th Light Horse Regiment. Re-designated 13th Motor Regiment in March 1943
14th Armoured Regiment	June 1942	March 1943	Previously 17th Machine Gun Regiment, 4th Armoured Regiment and 104th Motor Regiment
1st Army Tank Battalion	May 1942	End of war	Previously 1st Armoured Car and 1st Motor Regiment. Redesignated 1st Armoured Regiment in 1944.
2nd Army Tank Battalion	May 1942	March 1944	Previously 2nd Armoured Car Regiment
3rd Army Tank Battalion	May 1942	March 1944	Raised as 3rd Armoured Regiment
Independent Squadrons
2/1st Light Tank Squadron	October 1941	October 1942	Re-designated 1st Armoured Brigade Reconnaissance Squadron in early 1942
2/2nd Light Tank Squadron	October 1941	October 1942	Re-designated 2/2nd Armoured Brigade Reconnaissance Squadron in early 1942
3rd Armoured Brigade Reconnaissance Squadron	February 1942	February 1943	
2/1st Armoured Brigade Reconnaissance Squadron	September 1943	End of war	Previously 1st Armoured Division HQ Squadron. Later re-designated Special Equipment Squadron
2/1st Amphibious Armoured Squadron	August 1944	End of war	
1st Armoured Car Squadron	January 1946		Formed for occupation duties in Japan. Expanded to form the 1st Armoured Regiment following its return to Australia in July 1949.
Divisional Carrier Companies
3rd Division Carrier Company	Early to mid-1943	End of war	
5th Division Carrier Company	Early to mid-1943	End of war	
6th Division Carrier Company	Early to mid-1943	End of war	
7th Division Carrier Company	Early to mid-1943	End of war	
9th Division Carrier Company	Late 1943	End of war	
11th Division Carrier Company	Early to mid-1943	End of war	
Sources: Note: The date of formation given for the Militia units is in most cases the date they were converted from a horse-mounted or motorised unit into an armoured unit.

== See also ==
- Australian Army during World War II
- Structure of the Australian Army during World War II
- British armoured formations of the Second World War
- Tanks in the Australian Army
