= 3rd Army Tank Brigade =

- Active: 1942–1943
- Country: Australia
- Branch: Australian Army
- Type: Armoured

The 3rd Army Tank Brigade was an armoured brigade of the Australian Army during the Second World War. The brigade was formed in May 1942 and disbanded in September 1943 without seeing combat.

== History ==
The 3rd Army Tank Brigade was formed on 6 May 1942 to provide armoured support to infantry formations. The brigade headquarters was formed from the previously existing 4th Motor Brigade, although its constituent motor regiments (6th, 7th and 14th) were either disbanded or transferred to the 2nd Motor Brigade. It comprised three regiments which had previously formed part of the 1st Cavalry Division; the 1st Machine Gun Regiment, 2nd Armoured Regiment and 3rd Armoured Regiment. For consistency with similar British units, these regiments were renamed the 1st, 2nd and 3rd Army Tank Battalions respectively. The brigade was equipped with Matilda II infantry tanks which had previously been issued to the 1st Armoured Brigade. The 3rd Army Tank Brigade was also placed under the overall command of the 1st Armoured Division.

Upon formation, the headquarters of the 3rd Army Tank Brigade was located at Greta, New South Wales. The 1st and 2nd Army Tank Battalions were stationed in the nearby towns of Dungog and Largs, and the 3rd Army Tank Battalion was in the process of moving from Goulburn, New South Wales to Greta. By July 1942 the brigade was located at Singleton, New South Wales.

As part of a restructure of the Army's armoured units, the 1st Army Tank Battalion was transferred from the 3rd Army Tank Brigade to the newly-formed 4th Armoured Brigade in February 1943. This battalion was not replaced, and the 3rd Army Tank Brigade was reorganised as a two battalion brigade.

On 16 July 1943 it was decided to convert the 3rd Army Tank Brigade into two independent battalion groups as part of broad reforms to the structure of the Army, through which units not considered likely to see combat were disbanded to free up manpower and other resources. The brigade was gradually disbanded between 6 August and 26 September 1943. Elements of the 3rd Army Tank Brigade's support units were attached to the 2nd and 3rd Army Tank Battalions to form self-sustaining battalion groups. The 2nd Army Tank Battalion was also re-equipped with M3 Grant medium tanks in September 1943. Both of the tank battalion groups were disbanded in March 1944. The 3rd Army Tank Brigade was commanded by Brigadier J.A. Clarebrough throughout its brief history.

== See also ==
- Australian armoured units of World War II

== Works consulted ==
- Beale, Peter (2011). Fallen Sentinel: Australian Tanks in World War II. Newport, NSW: Big Sky Publishing. ISBN 9781921941023.
- Hopkins, R.N.L. (1978). Australian Armour: A History of the Royal Australian Armoured Corps 1927–1972. Canberra: Australian Government Publishing Service. ISBN 0-642-99407-2.
- McKenzie-Smith, Graham (2018). The Unit Guide: The Australian Army 1939–1945, Volume 2. Warriewood, New South Wales: Big Sky Publishing. ISBN 978-1-925675-146.
