= Robert Nimmo =

Australian Army officer (1893–1966)

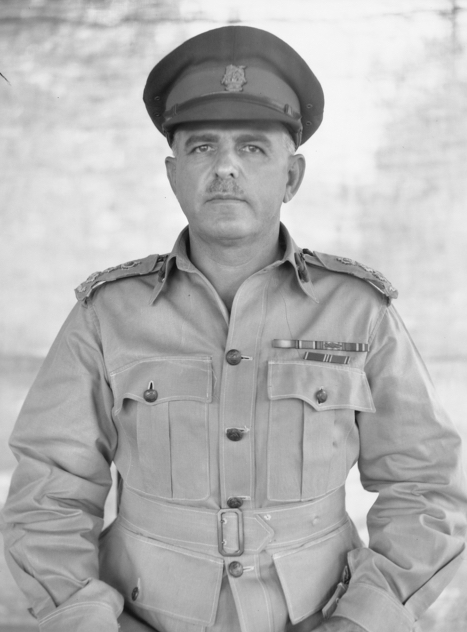
- Nimmo in 1945
- Born: 22 November 1893; Einasleigh, Queensland
- Died: 4 January 1966 (aged 72); Rawalpindi, Pakistan
- Burial place: Anzac section of the Mount Gravatt Cemetery in Nathan, Brisbane
- Spouses: Joan Margaret Cunningham (m. 1921–1940) Mary Dundas Page (m. 1942–1966)
- Children: 4
- Military career
- Branch: Australian Army then United Nations
- Service years: 1912–1966
- Rank: Lieutenant General
- Nickname: "Putt"
- Service number: QX23797
- Unit: 5th Light Horse Regiment
- Commands: United Nations Military Observer Group in India and Pakistan (1950–1966); Northern Command (1946–1950); 34th Infantry Brigade (1945–1946); 4th Base Sub Area (1945); 1st Armoured Brigade (1943); 4th Cavalry Brigade (1942)
- Conflicts: World War I; Gallipoli campaign; Sinai and Palestine campaign; World War II; New Guinea campaign; Bougainville campaign; Occupation of Japan; United Nations Military Observer Group in India and Pakistan; Indo-Pakistani War of 1965
- Awards: Commander of the Order of the British Empire; Mentioned in Despatches

Lieutenant General Robert Harold Nimmo, CBE (22 November 1893 – 4 January 1966) was a senior Australian Army officer who served in World War I, in World War II, with the British Commonwealth Occupation Force in Japan, as general officer commanding (GOC) Northern Command in Australia, and finally as the chief military observer of the United Nations Military Observer Group in India and Pakistan from 1950 until his death in 1966. Raised on a sheep station in far north Queensland, Nimmo attended the Southport School in southern Queensland before entering the Royal Military College, Duntroon, in 1912. He was the senior cadet of his class, graduating early to participate in World War I. He served with the 5th Light Horse Regiment during the Gallipoli and Sinai and Palestine campaigns, reaching the rank of major. He was praised for his leadership as a light horse squadron commander and for his skills as the brigade major of the 1st Light Horse Brigade in the final stages of the war.

At the end of the war, Nimmo transferred to the permanent Australian Staff Corps, and served as a company commander and instructor at Duntroon before a series of staff postings at cavalry formations in Victoria. He was also a talented sportsman, representing Australia in field hockey, and the state of Victoria in a range of sports. After attending the British Army's Senior Officers' School, he was promoted to lieutenant colonel and served as a senior staff officer on the headquarters of two cavalry divisions. At the outbreak of World War II, he was initially retained in Australia to help develop an Australian armoured force, and was subsequently promoted to brigadier and commanded a cavalry and then an armoured brigade in Australia. Following this he was posted as a senior staff officer at corps and then at army headquarters level in Australia. Nimmo administered command of Northern Territory Force before deploying to the island of Bougainville in the Territory of New Guinea to command the 4th Base Sub Area, the logistics organisation supporting the Bougainville campaign. His final posting of the war was as a senior staff officer on First Australian Army headquarters in Lae in New Guinea.

Soon after the Japanese surrender, Nimmo was selected to command the 34th Brigade, and led it from Morotai in the Dutch East Indies to Japan, where it formed part of the British Commonwealth Occupation Force. Upon returning from Japan to Australia, he was promoted to major general and posted as GOC Northern Command. He was appointed as a Commander of the Order of the British Empire in 1950, and retired from the army at the end of that year. Almost simultaneously he was appointed as the chief military observer of the UN Military Observer Group in India and Pakistan (UNMOGIP), responsible for monitoring the 800-kilometre-long (500 mi) ceasefire line between the Indian and Pakistani armed forces, which extended from the Kashmir Valley to the Himalayas. He was promoted by Australia to honorary lieutenant general in 1954, at the suggestion of the United Nations. In 1964, the UN Secretariat described him as "by far the most successful United Nations observer ever". He died of a heart attack in his sleep on 4 January 1966 at Rawalpindi, Pakistan, and was buried in the Anzac section of Mount Gravatt Cemetery, Brisbane, with full military and United Nations honours and senior representatives of both India and Pakistan were present. Nimmo was the first Australian to command a multinational peacekeeping force, and his command of UNMOGIP remains the longest-ever command of a UN operation.

== Early life and education ==
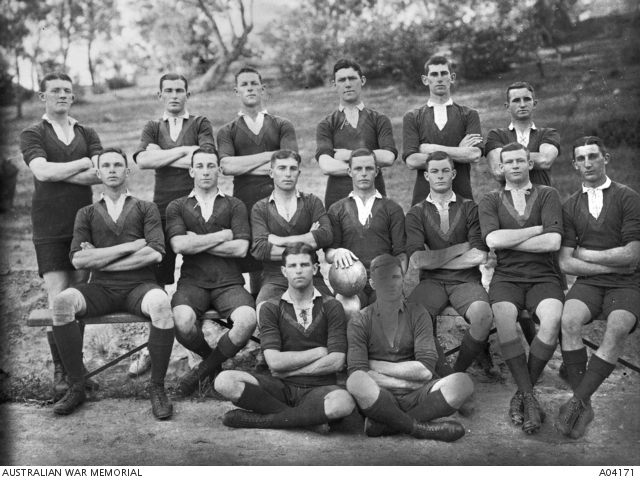
Members of the first fifteen, first grade rugby team, at the Royal Military College, Duntroon, in 1913. Robert Nimmo is seated on the ground on the left.

Robert Harold Nimmo was born on 22 November 1893 at Oak Park Station, a sheep station near the town of Einasleigh in far north Queensland. He was the fifth of nine children of James Russel Nimmo, a Scottish-born grazier, and his wife Mary Ann Eleanor née Lethbridge, who was born in Victoria. Known within his family as Harold, between 1904 and 1911 Nimmo attended the Southport School, an independent Anglican school south of the Queensland capital of Brisbane (now part of the Gold Coast). He achieved excellent results in both academic and sporting pursuits while at school.

In the year that Nimmo finished at the Southport School, the Royal Military College, Duntroon, opened in the national capital of Canberra, and on 7 March 1912, he joined the second intake of officer trainees for the small Australian Permanent Military Forces. He became known by the nickname "Putt" while at Duntroon. After the outbreak of World War I in August 1914 it was decided to graduate Nimmo's class fourteen months early in November of that year.

== World War I ==
=== Gallipoli campaign ===
Nimmo was appointed as a lieutenant in the Permanent Military Forces upon graduation on 3 November 1914, having held the position of the senior cadet of his 40-strong class, known as the company sergeant major. He was commissioned as a lieutenant into the Australian Imperial Force (AIF) and joined the 5th Light Horse Regiment, part of Colonel Granville Ryrie's 2nd Light Horse Brigade which was forming from men recruited in Queensland. On 21 December the regiment sailed from Sydney for the Middle East aboard SS Persic, a White Star Line ocean liner that had been converted into a troopship and redesignated HMAT A34. The regiment arrived in Egypt on 1 February 1915. Initially considered unsuitable for the landing at Gallipoli on 25 April, the whole brigade was landed at Anzac Cove on 20 May in a dismounted role to reinforce the severely depleted infantry of the 1st Division that had been fighting the Gallipoli campaign since 25 April. Nimmo was a troop commander in A Squadron, and although the regiment performed a defensive role for most of the campaign, it was involved in some minor attacks. Nimmo was involved in considerable fighting during the campaign.

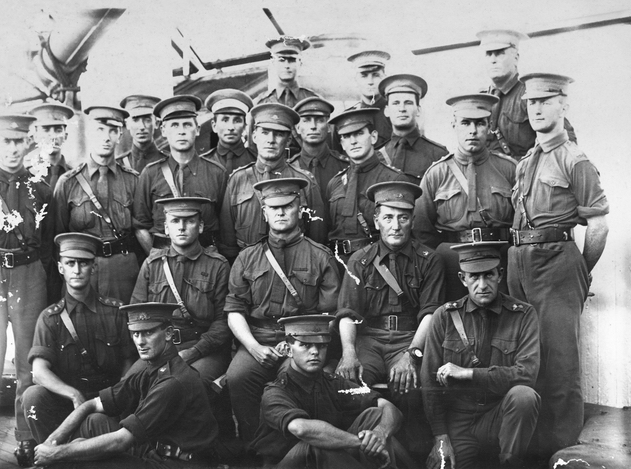
Nimmo (sitting on deck front centre) with a group of officers en route to the Middle East

In the second week of June the 2nd Light Horse Brigade was deployed onto the southernmost flank of the Australian frontline at Gallipoli. A competition then ensued by which the Australians and opposing Ottoman Army troops extended their trenches south, with the Australian position terminating at Chatham's Post at the seaward end of a long spur. The opposing Ottoman trench system at this point was the Echelon Trenches. The 2nd Light Horse Brigade was ordered to conduct a feint attack towards the Echelon Trenches, and to occupy an intermediate position known as the Balkan Pits from which the Ottomans were to be led to believe the attack was to be launched. A Squadron of the 5th Light Horse Regiment was to occupy the Balkan Pits with cover from other elements of the brigade from various positions, along with artillery. Nimmo was in the forefront of this advance, engaging exposed Ottoman troops as they went, causing confusion, but drawing fire and warning the Ottomans of the danger, and they promptly occupied the Echelon Trenches in response. The half-squadron, now in the Balkan Pits, was engaged by Ottoman artillery, and there was some friendly fire from a British destroyer which also caused casualties. Despite accompanying heavy rifle fire and Ottoman troops approaching from two directions, the lighthorsemen remained in position. Nimmo's leadership in steadying the forward troops at this juncture was noted in the Australian official history of the war. With the Ottomans closing in, the lighthorsemen were ordered to withdraw, but they refused to leave any wounded behind, which slowed their eventual return to the Australian line about dusk. During the operation, the 5th Light Horse Regiment lost 24 killed, 79 wounded, and one taken prisoner.

On 16 July Nimmo was appointed as regimental adjutant and twelve days later he was temporarily promoted to captain. He was evacuated with enteric fever in late August, and because he was no longer performing his adjutant duties he reverted to his substantive rank of lieutenant on 30 August. He was admitted to hospital in Alexandria in Egypt on 6 September then evacuated to the UK on 23 September where he was admitted to hospital in London on 5 October. Due to his absence from his unit, he was placed on the supernumerary list on 13 December.

=== Sinai and Palestine campaign ===
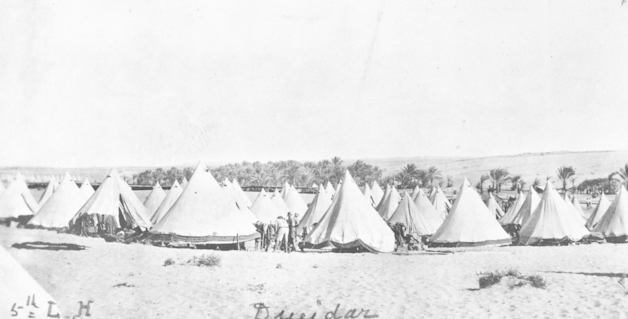
The 5th Light Horse Regiment camp at Dueidar

On 20 December 1915 the 5th Light Horse Regiment was withdrawn from Gallipoli when all Australian forces were evacuated. On 4 February 1916 Nimmo reported to the Australian personnel depot in the UK after recuperating from his illness, and a month later he departed to return to the Middle East, sailing on the SS Arcadian, another converted liner used as a troopship. He disembarked at Alexandria on 16 May. In March 1916 the 5th Light Horse Regiment had joined the ANZAC Mounted Division forming in Egypt, and was involved in the defence of the Suez Canal from an Ottoman advance, although its main task was long-range patrolling. Nimmo was posted back to his former regiment on 25 June, but the following day was appointed as second-in-command of an ad hoc subunit, the 2nd Double Squadron. He was temporarily promoted to captain on 1 July to fulfil this role. He returned to the regiment on 22 July and his promotion to captain was made substantive. In July he was designated as a staff trainee within the "G" (Operations) Branch of the headquarters of the ANZAC Mounted Division. By this time, the 5th Light Horse Regiment was based at Dueidar – west of Katia on the northern Sinai Peninsula, from where extensive patrolling and reconnaissance was conducted. On 17 October Nimmo was again appointed as regimental adjutant.

On 12 December Nimmo was temporarily detached to the 3rd Light Horse Brigade, but returned to his regiment on 27 December. On 24 February 1917 he was seconded to the headquarters of the 2nd Light Horse Brigade for training as a staff captain. In February and March, the 2nd Light Horse Brigade conducted brigade-level reconnaissance into Palestine towards Gaza. Nimmo's secondment to headquarters of the 2nd Light Horse Brigade included the failed First Battle of Gaza on 26 March. On 15 April Nimmo was seconded as a staff captain to the British 160th Infantry Brigade which was part of the 53rd (Welsh) Infantry Division. The 53rd (Welsh) Infantry Division had received significant casualties in the First Battle of Gaza. While Nimmo was with the British division, it was involved in a second failure to capture Gaza on 17–19 April, in which the 160th Infantry Brigade managed to capture Samson's Ridge following many unsuccessful attempts and serious losses. After three months with the British, Nimmo returned to the 5th Light Horse Regiment on 14 July on promotion to major, posted as officer commanding B Squadron. Nimmo led B Squadron during several minor brigade and regimental operations targeting enemy patrols and outposts in the vicinity of Beersheba in July, and August, before spending September engaged in training and inspections at the rest camp at Tel el Marakeb.

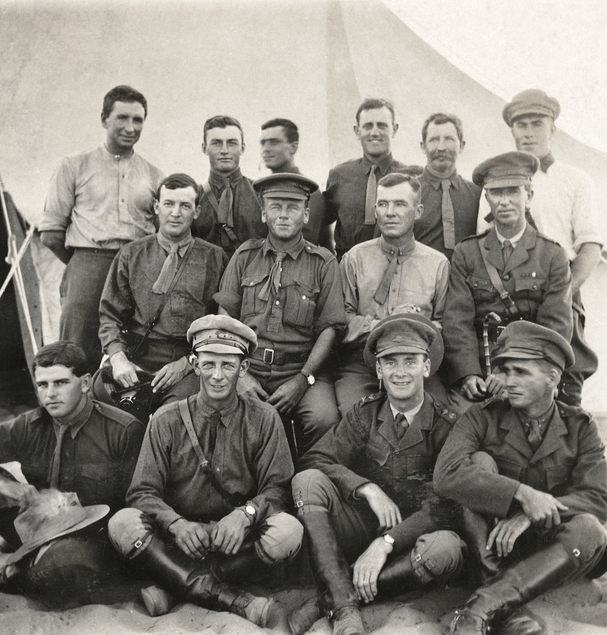
Nimmo (left front) with officers of the 5th Light Horse Regiment at Romani in November 1916

Between 21 and 29 October, Nimmo and his squadron were detached to the Imperial Camel Corps Brigade for patrol and outpost duty. Nimmo led his squadron during the successful Battle of Beersheba on 31 October, where the 5th Light Horse Regiment helped cut the Beersheba-Hebron road at Sakati to isolate the Ottoman defenders. The presence of the 2nd Light Horse Brigade across the Beersheba-Hebron road helped to give the German general commanding the Ottoman forces in the sector, Friedrich Freiherr Kress von Kressenstein, the false impression that the Allied advance would now be aimed at Jerusalem, and he made troop dispositions that weakened the defences at Gaza. Nimmo's squadron then participated in the follow-up operations around Tel el Khuweilfe in the first few days of November, which were initially led by the 5th Light Horse Regiment. Soon after, the 5th Light Horse Regiment participated in the successful Third Battle of Gaza on 7 November, where it advanced quickly with exposed flanks to attempt to cut off the retreating Ottoman forces at Huj, but was unable to reach its objective despite fighting "dashingly". Later that day the 5th Light Horse Regiment attacked the Tel Abu Dilakh ridge, covering the 1.6–2.4 km (1–1.5 mi) to the ridge at a gallop under heavy artillery fire. While the regiment was held up by guns firing from a distant village, they pushed forward in the morning and captured the enemy artillery.

After this concentrated period of heavy fighting, Nimmo's regiment was rested on the coast for three days before rejoining the force that pursued the Ottoman forces north along the coast. In late November and early December, the 5th Light Horse Regiment held a defensive position along the Auja river, before the entire brigade received a week's rest. The 5th Light Horse Regiment then helped capture Jerusalem. The wet winter made operations impossible over the period from late December 1917, and Nimmo's regiment was sent further south to Esdud to continue its rest and recuperation, which continued until mid-March 1918 when they broke camp and rode to Jerusalem. From there the brigade rode to the Jordan River and crossed at Hajla on 23/24 March as part of the raid on Amman. They crossed the Jordan Valley and climbed the plateau a few hours' ride from their objective. On 26 March, two squadrons of the 5th Light Horse Regiment – one of which was Nimmo's – attacked a convoy on the Amman-Es Salt road, and captured two dozen vehicles and 12 prisoners, and on the following day cut the railway to the north of Amman by blowing up a bridge. During the stealthy approach march to the railway line, Nimmo's squadron was the advance guard and his handling of his squadron was described by the commander of the raid as "masterly". The 2nd Light Horse Brigade then engaged in a demonstration on the left flank of a night attack on Amman by the rest of the raiding force. Like the two daylight attempts that preceded it, this attack was also a failure. The 2nd Light Horse Brigade withdrew to Es Salt.

The 5th Light Horse Regiment then spent most of the next three months securing the west bank of the Jordan. On 26 April, Nimmo accompanied his commanding officer on a reconnaissance of fords along the Jordan, and the following day Nimmo's squadron was the advance guard for the crossing of the river. The brigade then joined the Australian Mounted Division near Es Salt on 1 May. The 5th Light Horse Regiment took up positions near Es Salt, which had been captured by the 3rd Light Horse Brigade on 30 April, and fought off an Ottoman attack on 3 May, after which the regiment withdrew to a bivouac area south of Jericho. While these two raids were unsuccessful at the tactical level, they contributed to the Ottoman commanders becoming convinced that the next major Allied offensive would involve them crossing the Jordan.

The regiment rotated in and out of the outpost line from 22 May, and from 11 June Nimmo spent two weeks acting as brigade major of the 2nd Light Horse Brigade while the incumbent was on leave, followed by six weeks at the senior officers' school near Cairo. On 17 September he was appointed as brigade major of the 1st Light Horse Brigade, which was conducting operations near Es Salt. Nimmo prepared the orders for the key role the brigade played in the capture of Amman on 25 September and a follow-up operation on 28 September at Kirb Es Samra and El Mafrak, in which it took more than eight hundred Ottoman and four German prisoners and captured 16 artillery pieces. From 7 October Nimmo spent two weeks in hospital with malaria followed by two weeks' sick leave, rejoining the 1st Light Horse Brigade on 12 November after the Ottoman Empire had signed the Armistice of Mudros, ending the fighting in the Middle East. On 21 January 1919 Nimmo's mention in despatches was announced in the London Gazette for his services during the period from 16 March to 18 September 1918. A month later he embarked at Suez aboard the Novgorod to return to Australia.

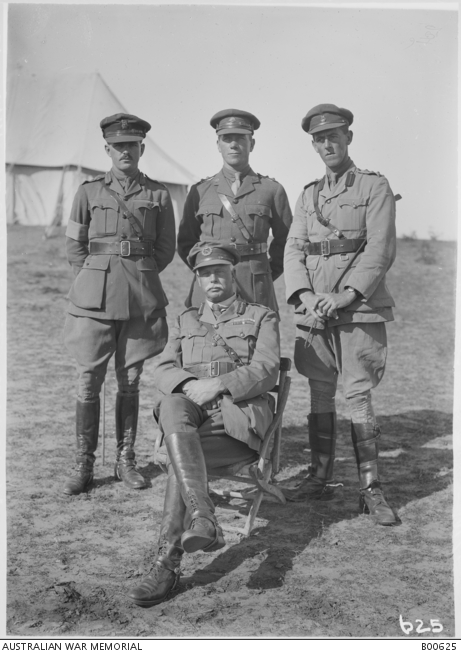
Group portrait of Brigadier General Charles Cox, sitting, and staff of his 1st Australian Light Horse Brigade, pictured here in Palestine, November 1918. Also pictured is Cox's brigade major, Major Nimmo.

Nimmo's record with the 5th Light Horse Regiment was described by his commanding officer, Lieutenant Colonel Donald Cameron, as "a particularly fine one", and he was also described by Cameron as possessing "personal qualifications of the highest order" and as "a most gallant and able leader". His commanding officer's report on his performance was endorsed by the commander of the 1st Light Horse Brigade, Brigadier General Charles Frederick Cox, who described him as "an excellent brigade major", and by the commander of the ANZAC Mounted Division, Major General Edward Chaytor. Nimmo's AIF appointment was terminated on 19 June 1919, and he was transferred to the Australian Staff Corps, the small corps of officers of the Permanent Military Forces responsible for the training of the part-time forces. For his service in World War I, he was entitled to the 1914–15 Star, British War Medal and Victory Medal. Upon his return to Australia, Nimmo was presented the 1915 Sword of Honour, an award for the cadet in each Duntroon graduating class who displays the most exemplary conduct and performance of duties.

== Interwar period ==
From 20 June 1919 to 17 January 1920, Nimmo was posted as assistant brigade major of the 3rd Brigade Area, 1st Military District in Brisbane. On 18 January 1920 he was posted as a company commander and instructor at Duntroon, a posting he remained in until early 1925. On 25 June 1921 he married Joan Margaret Cunningham, known as "Peggy", at St John's Anglican Church, Darlinghurst, in Sydney. Peggy was a daughter of the owners of Lanyon Station in the Federal Capital Territory. Nimmo and Peggy had one son and one daughter. On 31 January 1925, Nimmo was posted as brigade major of the 3rd Cavalry Brigade, headquartered in Melbourne. This was followed by a posting in July of the same year as assistant adjutant & quartermaster general (AA&QMG) of the 2nd Cavalry Division, headquartered in Melbourne, which included formations based in Victoria and South Australia. He was also the inspector general of communications for the division, responsible for the line of communications of the formation. His next posting was as brigade major of the 5th Cavalry Brigade, again in Melbourne, from 1 January 1926. He was a talented sportsman, representing Australia in field hockey in 1927, 1930 and 1932. He also represented the state of Victoria in rugby union, cricket, tennis and polo, as well as hockey. In 1930, The Age newspaper described him as the best player in the victorious Victorian team in the all-Australian hockey championship. He was also a selector for the Australian and Victorian hockey teams.

On 1 September 1932, Nimmo returned to his previous role as brigade major of the 3rd Cavalry Brigade, before reprising another previous role as AA&QMG of the 2nd Cavalry Division from 15 January 1935. While performing this role he was also appointed as an aide-de-camp to the Governor of Victoria, Lord Huntingfield. On 16 March 1937, Nimmo embarked for the UK to attend the 54th course of the British Army's Senior Officers' School at Sheerness in Kent between 27 September 1937 and 15 December 1937, and returned to Melbourne on 6 June 1938. Nimmo was issued with the King George V Silver Jubilee Medal in 1935 and the King George VI Coronation Medal in 1937. On 2 July 1938, he was promoted to lieutenant colonel, and commenced duties as general staff officer grade I (GSO I) at the 2nd Cavalry Division two days later. This was followed by a posting to the same position at the 1st Cavalry Division in Sydney from 17 April 1939, where he remained posted when World War II broke out in September. As with many of his senior cavalry colleagues, he remained in Australia to assist in the development of a modern armoured force within the Australian Army.

== World War II ==
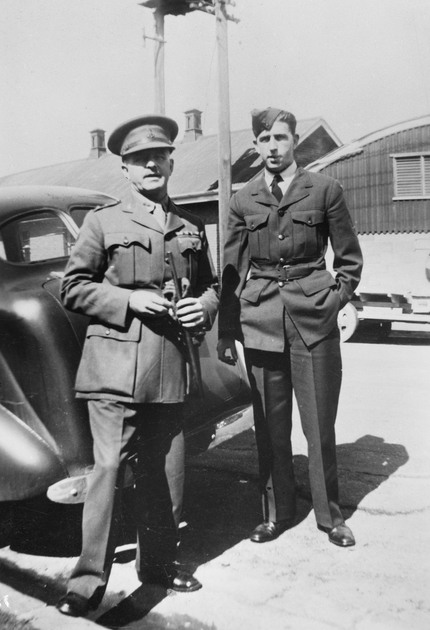
Nimmo and his son James, who was killed in 1944

In March 1940, Nimmo's wife Peggy was killed in a fall at The Gap, a tall cliff near Rosa Gully, north of Dover Heights in eastern Sydney; Nimmo was devastated. On 28 April the Army posted him to Brisbane as GSO I at Northern Command. In September 1941, he was seconded to the Second Australian Imperial Force and posted to the newly raised 1st Armoured Brigade which was forming at Greta, New South Wales, and he was promoted to temporary colonel to be the second-in-command of the brigade. On 10 January 1942, he was promoted to temporary brigadier, and posted to command the 4th Cavalry Brigade.

On 10 February 1942 he married fellow Queenslander Mary Dundas Page, at the Church of All Saints in Woollahra, Sydney. Mary was 26 years old and Nimmo was 48. In June, Nimmo was appointed as an aide-de-camp to the Governor-General of Australia, The Lord Gowrie. On 14 July his posting at 4th Cavalry Brigade ended. From 21 January to 16 June 1943, he commanded the 1st Armoured Brigade, before being posted as brigadier, general staff, of III Corps in Western Australia. After nearly a year in this role, on 17 May 1944 he was posted to the same role at the headquarters of the Second Army at Parramatta, New South Wales, which was responsible for units located in the south-eastern states. This was followed by a brief period in the same role at Northern Territory Force from 20 September to 28 October. He administered command of Northern Territory Force in the absence of its appointed commander from 28 October 1944 to 26 February 1945.

On 14 March, Nimmo flew to Torokina on the island of Bougainville in the Territory of New Guinea. Upon arrival he took command of the 4th Base Sub Area – the logistics formation supporting the formations fighting the Bougainville campaign – a position he held until 17 May. On that date he was posted as deputy assistant quartermaster general in the headquarters of Lieutenant General Vernon Sturdee's First Army at Lae in New Guinea, a position he held until 29 September when he was appointed to command the 34th Brigade, which was slated to form part of the British Commonwealth Occupation Force (BCOF) in Japan. His appointment as an aide-de-camp to the Governor General was extended to 31 July 1945. For his service in World War II, Nimmo was entitled to the Pacific Star, War Medal 1939–1945 and Australia Service Medal 1939–1945. His brother served as a medical officer at Duntroon during World War II, and his eldest son, James, a pilot officer in the Royal Australian Air Force, was killed on 10 April 1944 while serving with No. 103 Squadron of the Royal Air Force.

== Post-war service ==
On 7 October 1945 Nimmo returned to Australia, and on 18 October he flew to Morotai in the Dutch East Indies to assume command of the 34th Brigade. Between 10 and 22 December, he visited Japan ahead of the deployment of his brigade as part of BCOF, and he briefly returned to Australia between 3 and 11 January 1946. According to his entry in the Australian Dictionary of Biography, Nimmo calmly handled the so-called "Morotai incident" in January after his brigade was subjected to delays and public criticism which had nearly resulted in mutiny, impressing many. On 15 February, he embarked for Japan with his brigade, and disembarked at Kure, Japan, on 22 February. He was described by one who served under his command during this period as "a handsome officer of compact stature, unflappable and popular". He relinquished his command on 18 April and was placed on the reserve supernumerary list, returning to Australia on 7 May.

On 12 June, Nimmo was promoted to temporary major general and appointed as general officer commanding Northern Command, and district commandant, based in Brisbane. On 30 June 1947 his secondment to the Second AIF ceased, and he was seconded to the new Interim Army. On 1 October 1948 he was appointed as a substantive major general in the Australian Staff Corps. He continued to play sport, representing the Army in a cricket match against a United Services Institute team in Brisbane in 1949. He was appointed a Commander of the Order of the British Empire (CBE) in the Military Division in the 1950 King's Birthday Honours. The citation reads:

Maj-Gen Nimmo has been commissioned for over 35 years in the Australian Military Forces. He has given outstandingly loyal service and has been a leader not only in his profession but also in many sporting activities. During the 1939/45 War he served with distinction both as a Commander and as a Senior Staff Officer and was selected to command the 34th Infantry Brigade when it was raised for service in Japan at the end of 1945. He commanded 34th Infantry Brigade with distinction and in June 1946 was selected as General Officer Commanding Northern Command and promoted to Major-General. By his practical approach to problems and the high regard in which he is held by all classes of the community he has proved himself an able and efficient commander.

== United Nations service and death ==
Nimmo retired from the Australian Military Forces on 22 November 1950, after reaching the age of 57, the retirement age for his rank. In early 1950, in the wake of the Indo-Pakistani War of 1947–1948, the Australian diplomat and jurist Sir Owen Dixon was appointed as the United Nations (UN) mediator between India and Pakistan over the disputed State of Jammu and Kashmir. Dixon believed that the dispute could only be resolved through partition, but the UN Security Council had determined that a plebiscite of the population was necessary. Unable to get the Prime Minister of India, Jawaharlal Nehru, to agree to take the steps necessary to ensure that the plebiscite would be fair and free, Dixon's report criticised both sides for not reaching an agreement. In the wake of Dixon's report, the UN sought an Australian to serve as chief military observer (CMO) of the UN Military Observer Group in India and Pakistan (UNMOGIP), following the death of the previous CMO – Canadian Brigadier-General Harry Angle – in an aircraft crash. Given his reputation for calmness and resolution, and his wide experience, Nimmo was selected for the role, arriving in Kashmir in November. His wife Mary arrived three months later, along with their children.

The role of UNMOGIP was to monitor the 800-kilometre (500 mi) long ceasefire line between the Indian and Pakistani armed forces, which began in the lowland Kashmir Valley and extended through rugged and mountainous territory to the Himalayas in the north. Soon after Nimmo's appointment, there was a need to appoint a new UN mediator in the conflict to replace Dixon. American and some British decision-makers were interested in giving Nimmo the role alongside his appointment as CMO, but the Australian Department of External Affairs eventually took the view that to do so might undermine Nimmo's position as CMO. The formal relationship between the UN mediator – the American Frank Porter Graham – and Nimmo was described as "vague and uncertain". From 1952, following Nimmo's advocacy for their inclusion and the personal intervention of the Australian Prime Minister, Robert Menzies, UNMOGIP included Australians. Initially drawn from the Reserve of Officers and the part-time Citizen Military Forces, from 1958 they began to be selected from the recently expanded regular army as well. The use of regular officers reduced in the early 1960s as Australia's commitments in South-East Asia increased. According to two Australian officers who served with UNMOGIP in the mid-1960s, Nimmo deployed the Australians and New Zealanders to the toughest posts as he trusted them the most.

Nimmo's command was small, ranging from 30 to 99 personnel over the course of his period in command, but he consistently strove to ensure that the number of staff matched the work that was required, aiming to minimise the demands on contributing countries and maintain morale among the observers. He regularly visited officers along the ceasefire line, and his sporting skill, especially in polo, was much admired among all he interacted with. Nimmo quickly garnered a reputation as hardworking and efficient, and as an ideal military observer, "a model of firmness, tact, and silence". In 1953 Nimmo suffered a heart attack while travelling to the UN in New York and required some months to recover, but he was not replaced due to the high regard in which he was held by the UN. His Australian chief of staff initially performed his duties in his absence, but eventually the Belgian Major General Bennett Louis de Ridder was appointed as acting CMO for three months. After Nimmo reached the statutory retirement age of 60 in November 1953, extensions to his tenure were at the discretion of the UN Secretary-General, and they kept being approved because he was so well regarded by the UN.

When Nimmo returned after his convalescence, de Ridder remained with UNMOGIP, creating an awkward situation where there were two major generals appointed to the observer group, and rumours circulated that de Ridder would eventually replace Nimmo. The UN Secretariat suggested that Nimmo be promoted to lieutenant general to overcome this issue, and in recognition of his "outstanding ability, both in military matters and in diplomatic functions which he has been called on to perform". Although some in the Department of External Affairs – rather cynically, according to the Australian official war historians – suggested that Nimmo was seeking this promotion for himself, they directed the request to the Department of Defence. Defence pointed out that Nimmo was on the Retired List and could not be substantively promoted, but that he could be granted the honorary rank of lieutenant general while he remained with UNMOGIP. In November 1954, Nimmo was granted the honorary promotion, which he held until his death. In the same year, Indian complaints about the American observers resulted in the end of their contribution to UNMOGIP, and according to the Australian High Commissioner to India, Walter Crocker, Nimmo was content to see them go, as he did not consider them suited to the role. From November 1956, Nimmo made it his practice to appoint a Canadian colonel as his chief of staff. A hard worker himself, Nimmo also had high expectations of his staff. He progressively expanded the field regulations for UNMOGIP and provided copies to both sides of the conflict.

In 1964, the UN Secretariat reported that Nimmo was "by far the most successful United Nations observer ever", and the official war historians assert that "his professional expertise and diplomatic skills" ensured UNMOGIP was well run, despite its inability to solve the Kashmir problem. Nimmo led UNMOGIP through the Indo-Pakistani War of 1965, which he was powerless to prevent, and played an important part in trying to end. When the war broke out, Nimmo requested an additional 100 observers from troop-contributing countries, but no additional Australians were provided. According to the official historians, Nimmo's actions and correspondence during the war indicate that he had "thought deeply about ways of easing the conflict in Kashmir and was trying to impose realistic solutions". Immediately after the war concluded he raised and initially commanded the United Nations India-Pakistan Observation Mission (UNIPOM) outside Kashmir, and thereafter had oversight of UNIPOM as well as UNMOGIP. According to the historian Peter Londey, Nimmo had an extraordinary understanding of his role, which he fulfilled "through maintaining an open, firm but tactful relationship with both the belligerent parties, and [showing] favour to neither".

At the time of the 1965 war, Nimmo was beginning to feel the stress of his long period of command. For the first time, there were complaints about Australian bias, and the Pakistani government apparently asked for his replacement. UN Secretary-General U Thant refused, but told Nimmo of the complaints when Nimmo visited New York in December 1965. Nimmo was surprised by the complaints, but continued to lead UNMOGIP until his death of a heart attack in his sleep on 4 January 1966 at Rawalpindi, Pakistan, aged 72. By this time Mary and their daughter were living in London. Nimmo's death may have been accelerated by the pressures associated with the 1965 war. He was the first Australian to command a multinational peacekeeping force, and at 15 years and 2 months, his command of UNMOGIP remains the longest-ever command of a UN operation. After an Anglican service in Rawalpindi with Pakistani military honours and fellow Australian observers as pall bearers, his body was flown to Karachi and then Brisbane. His funeral was held at St John's Cathedral, and the gun carriage carrying his coffin was led by a 500-strong guard of honour. His funeral was attended by senior representatives of both India and Pakistan. He was buried in the Anzac section of the Mount Gravatt Cemetery in MacGregor, Brisbane, with full UN and military honours, including two 15-gun artillery salutes. He was survived by his second wife Mary and their son and daughter, and the daughter of his first marriage. His obituary in The Morning Bulletin newspaper in Rockhampton, Queensland, stated that he performed his duties "impeccably" and had "added considerably to Australia's stature internationally". In response to his death, U Thant issued a statement which read:

General Nimmo's wisdom, judgement and strength of character were complemented by a modesty, kindness and calmness which endeared him to the officers of many nationalities who served under him as military observers, and to all those with whom he worked both in the field and at United Nations Headquarters. The most difficult and dangerous situations did not ruffle his composure or affect at all his objectivity and determination to establish the true facts of a situation.
