= Australian 1st Division (disambiguation) =

The name 1st Division has been used for two different units of the Australian Army:

- 1st Division (Australia): 1914 to present – formed originally as an infantry unit, it is now the main regular combined arms formation of the Australian Army;
- 1st Armoured Division (Australia): formed in 1941 during the Second World War as an armoured unit. It was disbanded in 1943.
