= 2/5th Armoured Regiment (Australia) =

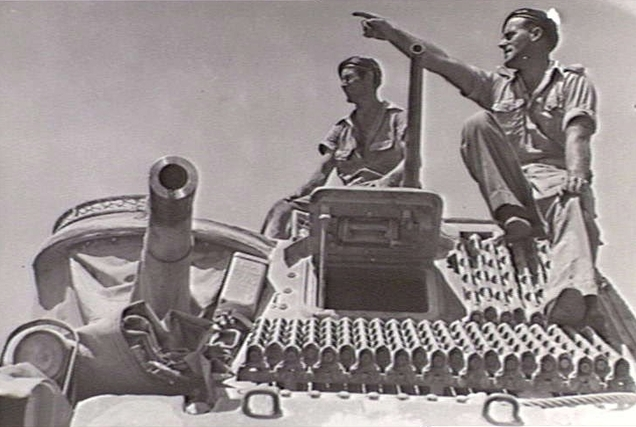
- Members of the 2/5th Armoured Regiment with an M3 Grant tank
- Active: 1941–1945
- Country: Australia
- Branch: Australian Army
- Type: Armoured
- Equipment: M3 Stuart and M3 Grant tanks

Insignia
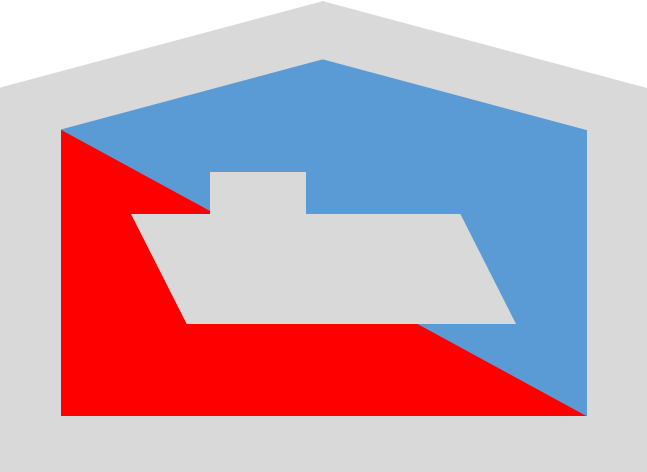
- Unit colour patch

The 2/5th Armoured Regiment was an armoured regiment of the Australian Army. Raised for service during World War II, the regiment was formed in 1941 and disbanded at the end of the war in 1945 without having been deployed outside of Australia.

== History ==
The 2/5th Armoured Regiment was formed on 26 July 1941 as part of the 1st Armoured Brigade of the 1st Armoured Division. Under the command of Lieutenant Colonel F.D Sandilands, the regiment was initially located at Grovely near Brisbane, Queensland, but joined the rest of the 1st Armoured Brigade at Greta, New South Wales, in October.

Following the outbreak of the Pacific War the 2/5th Armoured Regiment was equipped with Universal Carriers to train as a light armoured unit. The regiment was re-equipped with 52 M3 Grant medium tanks in April 1942, and moved to Edgeroi, New South Wales, in August to conduct large-scale exercises with the rest of the 1st Armoured Division. While the regiment was ordered to prepare for deployment to New Guinea in August or September 1942, it was replaced by the 2/6th Armoured Regiment which was equipped with lighter M3 Stuart tanks which were better suited to New Guinea's terrain.

In early 1943 the 2/5th Armoured Regiment moved to Western Australia with the rest of the 1st Armoured Division and was based near Geraldton. The regiment moved south to Moora in July 1943 and remained part of the independent 1st Armoured Brigade Group upon the 1st Armoured Division's disbandment in September. The 2/5th Armoured Regiment was transferred to the 4th Armoured Brigade in March 1944 and moved to Southport, Queensland to train for possible deployment overseas. Although the regiment was initially selected to support the 7th Division during the liberation of Balikpapan in July 1945 it was replaced by the Matilda II-equipped 1st Armoured Regiment shortly before it would have embarked for the operation. Later they were earmarked for deployment as part of Operation Zipper, but the war ended before the operation was commenced. The 2/5th Armoured Regiment was disbanded in September 1945.

== Commanding officers ==
The following is a list of officers that commanded the 2/5th Armoured Regiment:

- Lieutenant Colonel F.D Sandilands (July 1941 – April 1942);
- Lieutenant Colonel I.T Murdoch (April 1942 – April 1943);
- Lieutenant Colonel T.Mills (April 1943 – May 1944);
- Lieutenant Colonel H.J McIntyre (May 1944 – September 1945).
