= 4th Armoured Brigade (Australia) =

1943-1946 combat formation of the Australian Army

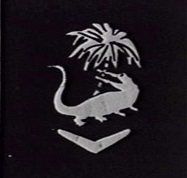
- The 4th Armoured Brigade's formation sign.
- Active: 1943–46
- Country: Australia
- Branch: Australian Army
- Type: Armoured
- Role: Infantry support
- Equipment: Matilda II and M3 Grant tanks
- Engagements: New Guinea Campaign; Bougainville Campaign; Borneo Campaign

Commanders
- Notable commanders: Denzil Macarthur-Onslow

The 4th Armoured Brigade was an armoured formation of the Australian Army established during the Second World War. It was formed in February 1943 to provide armoured support for infantry units operating in the South West Pacific Area. Its composition varied over time, but usually comprised several armoured regiments equipped with Matilda II or M3 Grant tanks as well as some support units.

The brigade's main role throughout its existence was to provide a pool of armoured units and sub-units that could be deployed to augment infantry forces. It was also responsible for developing specialised variants of armoured vehicles. Elements of the 4th Armoured Brigade were detached to support most of the Australian Army's major operations from 1943 until the end of the war, and from September 1944 it was the Army's only armoured brigade. The formation was disbanded, after the war, in February 1946.

== History ==
=== Establishment ===
The 4th Armoured Brigade was established in February 1943 as part of a reorganisation of the Australian Army's armoured units. As there was no longer any threat of Japanese forces invading Australia, the 2nd Armoured Division was disbanded to free up manpower for other purposes. However, it was decided to retain the headquarters of that division's 6th Armoured Brigade to command armoured units that were intended to take part in offensive operations in New Guinea and other locations in the South West Pacific. This specialised formation was designated the 4th Armoured Brigade. The need for armoured support of infantry forces had been demonstrated by the Army's experiences in the New Guinea Campaign during 1942 and early 1943.

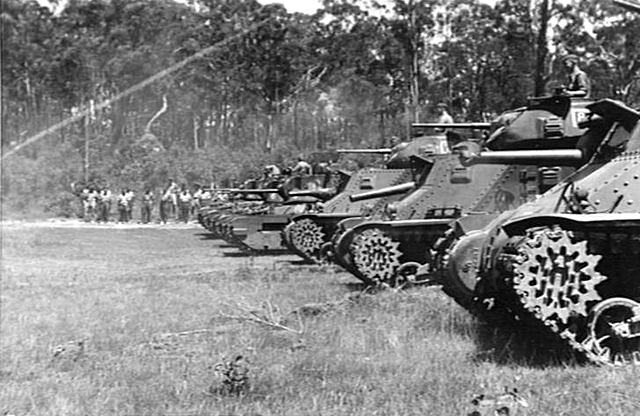
4th Armoured Brigade Matilda II and M3 Grant tanks firing small calibre weapons during a demonstration in 1944

The main role of the 4th Armoured Brigade was to provide detachments of tanks to support infantry units. As it was not practical or necessary to deploy large armoured units in the jungle terrain common across the South West Pacific, the brigade was organised into several self-supporting regimental groups. These regimental groups could in turn provide sub-units with the necessary logistics support to form the armoured component of other units during combat operations. This held in practice; during combat deployments regiments from the 4th Armoured Brigade were attached to infantry divisions or brigades, and their squadrons and troops generally operated independently as part of combined arms forces.

Upon formation, the main units of the 4th Armoured Brigade were the 1st Army Tank Battalion, 2/6th Armoured Regiment and 2/9th Armoured Regiment. The 1st Army Tank Battalion was equipped with Matilda II infantry tanks and had previously formed part of the 3rd Army Tank Brigade. The 2/6th Armoured Regiment had formed part of the 1st Armoured Division until August 1942 when it and its M3 Stuart light tanks were transferred to New Guinea. Elements of the regiment saw combat in the Battle of Buna–Gona, where the Stuart tanks were too lightly armoured to be effective. The 2/9th Armoured Regiment was transferred from the 3rd Armoured Division and equipped with M3 Grant medium tanks. The brigade also had several supporting engineer, medical, signals and services units. As the brigade was not intended to operate as a single unit, it lacked the armoured reconnaissance, artillery, combat engineer and infantry units which were standard elements of other Australian Army armoured brigades. The 4th Armoured Brigade's commander from its establishment until its disbandment was Brigadier Denzil Macarthur-Onslow.

=== Combat operations ===
The units of the 4th Armoured Brigade were concentrated at Singleton, New South Wales, on 10 March 1943. As of April that year, the brigade formed part of the Land Headquarters Reserve. The 1st Army Tank Battalion was subsequently transferred to Caboolture in southern Queensland and reorganised as a self-supporting battalion group while remaining part of the 4th Armoured Brigade. The unit was redesignated the 1st Tank Battalion on 10 June 1943, and in August that year was shipped to Milne Bay in New Guinea. It subsequently supported the 9th Division during the Landing at Lae and Huon Peninsula campaign. The 1st Tank Battalion returned to Australia in June 1944 and was redesignated again to become the 1st Armoured Regiment. In the meantime the 2/4th Armoured Regiment was added to the 4th Armoured Brigade in October 1943; this unit had previously formed part of the 3rd Armoured Division and was re-equipped with Matilda II tanks. Also in October 1943, a party from the 4th Armoured Brigade armed with pistols was sent to Grovely Camp near Brisbane to put down a riot by soldiers being held under detention there, but did not need to use force. During March 1944 the 2/6th Armoured Regiment was transferred to the 1st Armoured Brigade Group, and the 2/5th Armoured Regiment was transferred from that formation to the 4th Armoured Brigade.

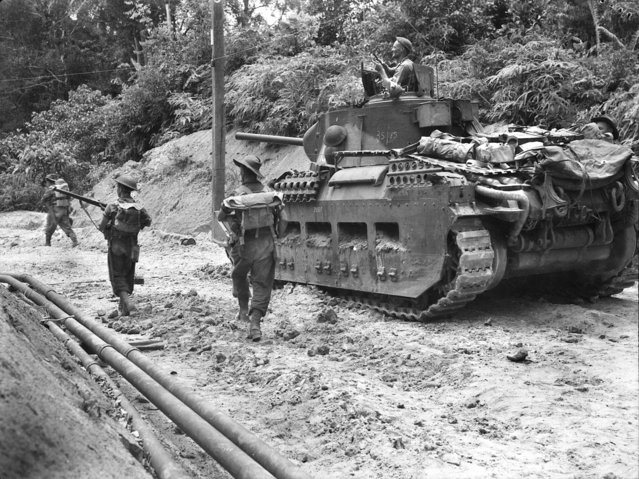
A 2/9th Armoured Regiment Matilda II tank supporting infantry during the fighting on Tarakan Island in May 1945

By mid-1944 the 4th Armoured Brigade was located in Southport, Queensland. As of 1 June, the brigade had a strength of 4,719 men and was scheduled to be ready for offensive operations by October that year. During June it also established a training area at Nerang in Queensland, where armoured units could practice operating in tropical conditions. In September 1944 the brigade gained the 2/1st Armoured Brigade Reconnaissance Squadron when the 1st Armoured Brigade Group was disbanded; this unit was reorganised to become the Armoured Squadron (Special Equipment) in January 1945. The 2/6th Armoured Regiment was also reassigned to the 4th Armoured Brigade, but was stationed in the Sydney area. Following the disbandment of the 1st Armoured Brigade Group the 4th Armoured Brigade was the last remaining armoured brigade in the Australian Army.

The 4th Armoured Brigade's structure continued to change during late 1944 and 1945. The 2/1st Armoured Amphibious Squadron was authorised to be raised as part of the brigade in October 1944, but not established until May the next year. This squadron was to operate troop-carrying Landing Vehicles Tracked, but they did not arrive in time for the unit to see action before the end of the war. In January 1945 the 2/6th Armoured Regiment was transferred to the direct control of Land Headquarters, and moved to Puckapunyal in Victoria the next month. This change proved short-lived though, as the 2/6th Armoured Regiment rejoined the 4th Armoured Brigade at Southport during July; B Squadron of this regiment had been transferred to the brigade in April ahead of the remainder of the regiment moving from Victoria to Queensland.

One of the 4th Armoured Brigade's regimental groups supported Australian Army offensive operations in New Guinea and Bougainville during 1944 and 1945. The 2/4th Armoured Regiment was transferred to New Guinea in August 1944, and came under the command of the First Australian Army. From January 1945 until the end of the war, C Squadron of the 2/4th Armoured Regiment supported the 6th Division during the Aitape–Wewak campaign. The regimental headquarters and two other squadrons took part in the Bougainville Campaign from October 1944 until the end of the war as part of II Corps.

During 1945 two 4th Armoured Brigade regimental groups saw action in the Borneo campaign. C Squadron of the 2/9th Armoured Regiment was attached to the 26th Brigade Group during the invasion of Tarakan in May 1945. The remainder of this regiment subsequently supported the 9th Division during the early stages of the Battle of North Borneo from 10 June. The 1st Armoured Regiment and Armoured Squadron (Special Equipment) were attached to the 7th Division, and took part in the Battle of Balikpapan from 1 July.

=== Trials and development work ===
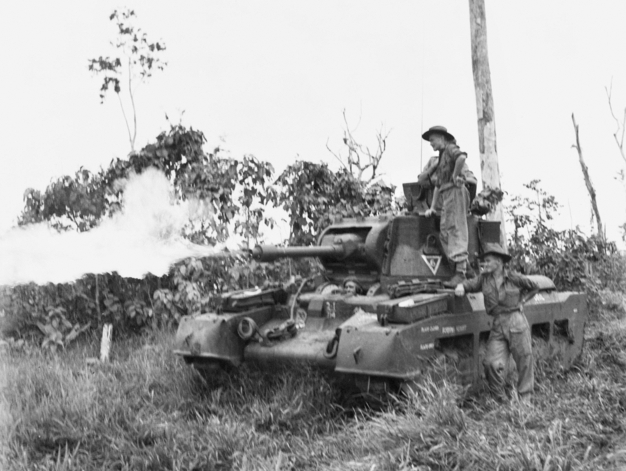
An Armoured Squadron (Special Equipment) Matilda Frog during a demonstration conducted for senior officers at Morotai in June 1945

Along with its combat role, the 4th Armoured Brigade was responsible for developing and deploying specialised types of tanks. Macarthur-Onslow played an important role in guiding these processes, including by helping his subordinates to overcome institutional barriers.

Variants of the Matilda II trialled or developed by the brigade included the "Frog" flame throwing tank, Matilda dozer and the bomb-throwing Matilda Hedgehog. The 2/5th Armoured Regiment also trialled a bulldozer variant of the Grant in 1945. The Frog and Matilda dozer were used in combat by the Armoured Squadron (Special Equipment) during the Borneo Campaign. The 2/4th Armoured Regiment was issued six Matilda Hedgehogs, but they did not arrive in Bougainville until after the end of the war. The 4th Armoured Brigade also trialled modifications to the Matilda II and Grant that sought to waterproof the tanks so they could travel through rivers and coastal waters. As well as trialling new tank variants, the Brigade developed an ammunition and fuel trailer which could be towed by Matilda II tanks. These trailers were used in combat zones by the 2/4th and 2/9th Armoured Regiments.

During 1944 the 4th Armoured Brigade provided crews for comparative trials of the American M4 Sherman and British Churchill tank in New Guinea conditions that were conducted by the Australian Army in response to a request from the British War Office. Macarthur-Onslow proposed including other tanks in these trials, including a British Cromwell that had been shipped to Australia in 1943, but this did not occur. Before the tanks were sent to New Guinea, the 4th Armoured Brigade trialled two Sherman tanks alongside Grants and Matilda IIs in Queensland during mid-1944. The Churchills and Shermans were subsequently trialled in the Madang region of New Guinea; the Churchill proved better suited to jungle conditions. The Australian Army later ordered 510 Churchills, but none were delivered before the end of the war.

=== Disbandment ===
By July 1945 the only elements of the 4th Armoured Brigade in Australia were the unit's headquarters, the 2/5th and 2/6th Armoured Regiments and the 2/1st Armoured Amphibious Squadron. The two regiments were preparing for offensive operations, including a planned but later cancelled invasion of Java, and did not leave Australia.

Most of the 4th Armoured Brigade's units were rapidly disbanded following the war. The 2/1st Armoured Amphibious Squadron was dissolved in August 1945, and the Armoured Squadron (Special Equipment) followed in October that year. The 4th Armoured Brigade headquarters and 2/5th and 2/6th Armoured Regiments were disbanded in February 1946, and the 2/9th Armoured Regiment during the early part of the year. Only the 1st Armoured Regiment remained an active unit, and returned to its pre-war designation of the 1st Royal New South Wales Lancers in 1949. Volunteers from the 4th Armoured Brigade manned the 1st Armoured Car Squadron, which was established in 1946 for service with the British Commonwealth Occupation Force in Japan; in 1949 this squadron was expanded to form the 1st Armoured Regiment, which remains an active part of the Australian Army. A memorial to the 4th Armoured Brigade was dedicated at Caboolture in 1993.

== See also ==
- Australian armoured units of World War II
- Tanks in the Australian Army

== Works consulted ==
- Beale, Peter (2011). Fallen Sentinel: Australian Tanks in World War II. Newport, NSW: Big Sky Publishing. ISBN 9781921941023.
- Dexter, David (1961). The New Guinea Offensives. Australia in the War of 1939–1945. Vol. Series 1 – Army. Volume VI. Canberra: Australian War Memorial. OCLC 2028994.
- Handel, Paul (2003). Dust, Sand and Jungle: A History of Australian Armour During Training and Operations, 1927–1948. Puckapunyal, Victoria: RAAC Memorial and Army Tank Museum. ISBN 9781876439750.
- Handel, Paul (2004). The Vital Factor : A History of 2/6th Australian Armoured Regiment 1941–1946. Loftus, NSW: Australian Military History Publications. ISBN 1876439610.
- Hopkins, R.N.L. (1978). Australian Armour: A History of the Royal Australian Armoured Corps 1927–1972. Canberra: Australian Government Publishing Service. ISBN 0642994072.
- Long, Gavin (1963). The Final Campaigns. Australia in the War of 1939–1945. Vol. Series 1 – Army. Volume VII. Canberra: Australian War Memorial. OCLC 1297619.
- Threlfall, Adrian (2014). Jungle Warriors: From Tobruk to Kokoda and Beyond, How the Australian Army Became the World's Most Deadly Jungle Fighting Force. Sydney: Allen & Unwin. ISBN 9781742372204.
