= III Corps (Australia) =

Australian Army corps

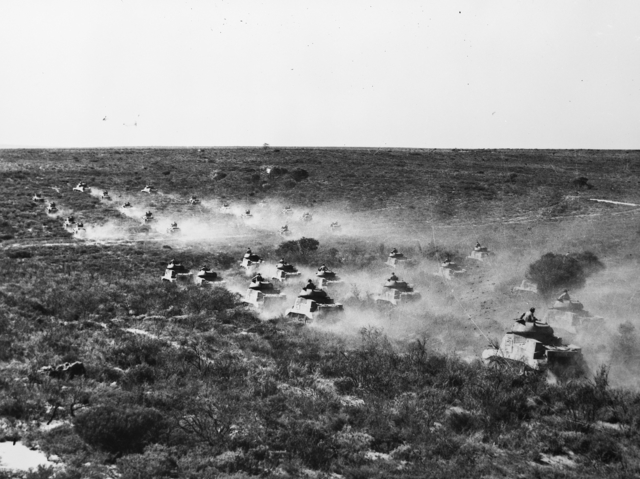
- Tanks from the 2/10th Armoured Regiment on exercise in Western Australia
- Active: 1942–1944
- Country: Australia
- Branch: Australian Army
- Engagements: World War II: Home front

Commanders
- Notable commanders: Gordon Bennett

Insignia
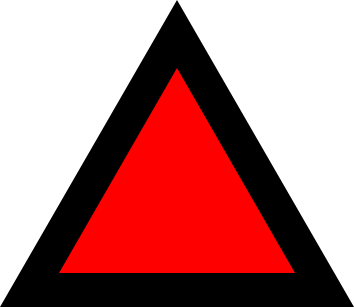
- Unit colour patch 1942–1944

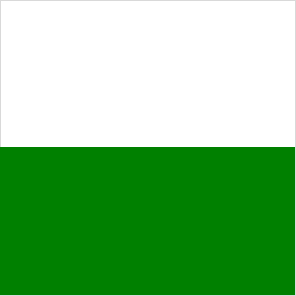
- 1939–1942 1944–1949

III Corps was an Australian Army unit during World War II. It was responsible for the defence of Western Australia in 1942–1944. The corps was formed in April 1942 from Western Command, which had been established in October 1939. Throughout the war, the formation's size expanded and contracted as available manpower, and the strategic situation, dictated. At its height, the corps consisted of two infantry divisions and one armoured division, which were deployed to defend against a Japanese invasion threat, which ultimately never eventuated. The corps ceased to exist in June 1944 when it was converted back into Western Command, which remained until the end of the war in 1945.

== History ==
The corps was raised from the previously existing headquarters Western Command, which had been formed in October 1939 at Swan Barracks, in Perth, Western Australia from the 5th Military District as part of initial war preparations following the declaration of war in Europe. In the early stages of the command's existence, there were few troops to spare, as most of the defensive forces from the Militia were deployed along the eastern coast of Australia. The founding unit of Western Command was a West Australian-formed Militia unit, the 13th Infantry Brigade. This supported by the 10th Light Horse Regiment and the 25th Light Horse (Machine Gun) Regiment. Two garrison battalions – the 5th and 10th – also provided defensive support around Fremantle. A third garrison battalion, the 19th, was also raised in Western Australia around this time for close defence, and they eventually formed the 5th Garrison Brigade; internment camp security was provided by 'M' Garrison Company.

In mid-1942, as elements of the Second Australian Imperial Force returned from the Middle East, and fears of Japanese surface attacks against the Australian mainland increased, the Australian government decided to reinforce Western Australia in the wake of the Western Australian emergency of March 1942. The 6th Infantry Brigade arrived in April 1942, and was followed by the 4th Division, a Militia division raised in Victoria, and the 2nd Infantry Brigade. The same month, III Corps headquarters was established at Mount Lawley, Western Australia. Lieutenant General Gordon Bennett, who had previously commanded the 8th Division in Malaya and on Singapore, was appointed corps commander, replacing Major General Eric Plant who had commanded Western Command. Shortly after its establishment, III Corps was placed under the command of the South West Pacific Area.

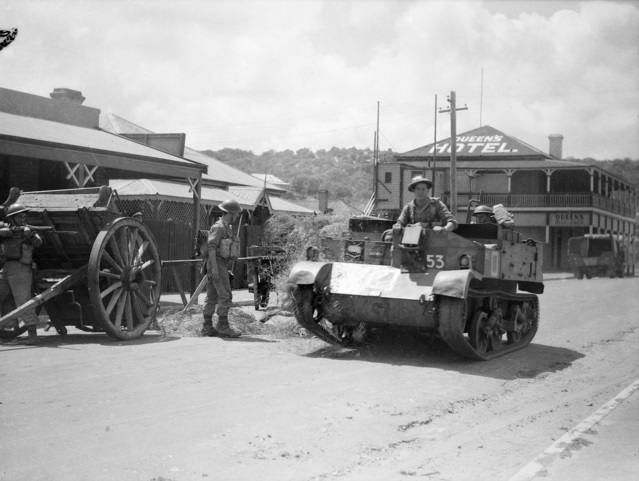
Troops of the 4th Division on exercise around Geraldton, October 1942

In August 1942, the 2nd Division, a New South Wales Militia unit, joined III Corps. It was headquartered at Guildford, while the 4th Division was headquartered at Moora. A large-scale anti invasion exercise was undertaken by the 4th Division around Geraldton in October 1942, during which time the 8th Infantry Brigade assumed the role of an attacking Japanese force, while the 2nd, 6th and 13th Infantry Brigades assumed defensive roles. Throughout late 1942, the corps' infantry divisions traded locations, with the 2nd Division moving into positions around Geraldton and Mingenew, and the 4th Division establishing itself in the Dandaragan–Gingin–Bellevue area, eventually establishing its headquarters around Guildford in December 1942.

The corps was expanded in October and November 1942, with the arrival of the first elements of the 1st Armoured Division, consisting of two brigades. These elements were the 3rd Motor Brigade, which occupied Mullewa; they were joined by the divisional headquarters in February 1943, and then the 1st Armoured Brigade in March. The remainder of the division arrived in April 1943, and eventually, the division would be based around Geraldton. By this time, though, the threat of invasion had diminished and after this the corps was progressively drawn down, with the 6th and 13th Infantry Brigades being transferred out in January and February 1943.

According to the Army History Unit:

At its peak, in Apr–May 1943, 3rd Corps included, in addition to 2nd and 4th Divisions, [the] 1st Armoured Division (1st Armoured Brigade and 3rd Motor Brigade). As the tide of war against Japan turned in favour of the Allies, the role of 3rd Corps in defence of WA diminished.

The main function of the corps then became the preparation of smaller units for active service in New Guinea and elsewhere in the Pacific. A succession of units then passed rapidly through it, as they were transferred closer to the fighting to the north of Australia. The 4th Division's headquarters moved to Townsville, in April 1943, at which time the 2nd Infantry Brigade was transferred to the 2nd Division, although it later departed for the Northern Territory in August 1943. The 1st Armoured Division's headquarters was disbanded in September 1943, with the 3rd Motor Brigade being transferred to the 2nd Division, while the 1st Armoured Brigade became a direct command unit of the corps headquarters. The same month, the 8th Brigade was transferred to the 5th Division and began moving east. By the end of the year, corps headquarters moved to Swan Barracks, in Perth, from Mount Lawley.

Concerns of a Japanese attack in March 1944 resulted in the corps being placed on notice to respond at short notice. However, the threat passed and further reductions took place throughout the early part of 1944, as the headquarters of the 2nd Division was disbanded in April. By this time only the 3rd Motor Brigade, at Chidlows, and the 1st Armoured Brigade remained in Western Australia. The corps commander, Bennett, retired in May 1944; around the same time, the Australian government had decided to reduce the size of the Army. As a result, it was decided there was no longer a need for a corps-level headquarters to be maintained in Western Australia. In June 1944, the corps was re-designated as Western Command, and assumed the role of the previously existing line of communications area that had been established in the state earlier in the war. The final combat units in Western Australia were disbanded shortly afterwards, with the 3rd Motor and the 1st Armoured Brigades disbanding in August and November 1944, respectively. Western Command remained in existence until the end of the war, providing an administrative function for all troops in Western Australia.

== Order of battle ==
The corps' assigned formations changed over the course of its existence as brigades and divisions were transferred in and out. Brigade allocations also changed as parent formations were disbanded throughout the corps' existence. The following formations were assigned to the corps over the course of its existence:

- 1st Armoured Division
  - 1st Armoured Brigade
  - 3rd Motor Brigade
- 2nd Division
  - 5th Infantry Brigade
  - 8th Infantry Brigade
- 4th Division
  - 2nd Infantry Brigade
  - 6th Infantry Brigade
  - 8th Infantry Brigade
  - 13th Infantry Brigade

== Bibliography ==
- Dexter, David (1961). The New Guinea Offensives. Australia in the War of 1939–1945. Series 1 – Army. Vol. VI. Canberra: Australian War Memorial. OCLC 2028994.
- Lambert, Zach (2012). "The Birth, Life and Death of the 1st Australian Armoured Division" (PDF). Australian Army Journal. IX (1). Canberra, Australian Capital Territory: Land Warfare Studies Centre: 89–103. ISSN 1448-2843. Archived from the original (PDF) on 2 November 2013.
- Lodge, A. B. (1993). "Bennett, Henry Gordon (1887–1962)". Australian Dictionary of Biography. Vol. 13. Melbourne University Press. pp. 165–167. ISBN 9780522845129.
- Long, Gavin (1963). The Final Campaigns. Australia in the War of 1939–1945. Series 1 – Army. Vol. VII. Canberra: Australian War Memorial. OCLC 1297619.
- McCarthy, Dudley (1959). South-West Pacific Area – First Year. Australia in the War of 1939–1945. Series 1 – Army. Vol. V. Canberra: Australian War Memorial. OCLC 3134247.
- McKenzie-Smith, Graham (2009). Defending Fremantle, Albany and Bunbury: 1939–1945. Mount Pleasant, Western Australia: Grimwade Publications. ISBN 978-0-9806-2910-1.
- McKenzie-Smith, Graham (2018a). The Unit Guide: The Australian Army 1939–1945, Volume 2. Warriewood, New South Wales: Big Sky Publishing. ISBN 978-1-925675-146.
- McKenzie-Smith, Graham (2018b). "The Japanese Landing at Dongara – 24–28 October 1942". Sabretache. LIX (3 (September)). Military History Society of Australia: 61–63. ISSN 0048-8933.
- Morgan, Benjamin (2018). "Australian Garrison Battalions During the Second World War". Sabretache. LIX (4 (December)). Military Historical Society of Australia: 35–42. ISSN 0048-8933.
- Sutton, R. (2002). "Plant, Eric Clive Pegus (1890–1950)". Australian Dictionary of Biography. Vol. 16. Melbourne, Australia: Melbourne University Press. ISBN 978-0-5228-4997-4.
