= 1st Armoured Division (Australia) =

1941-43 armoured formation of the Australian Army

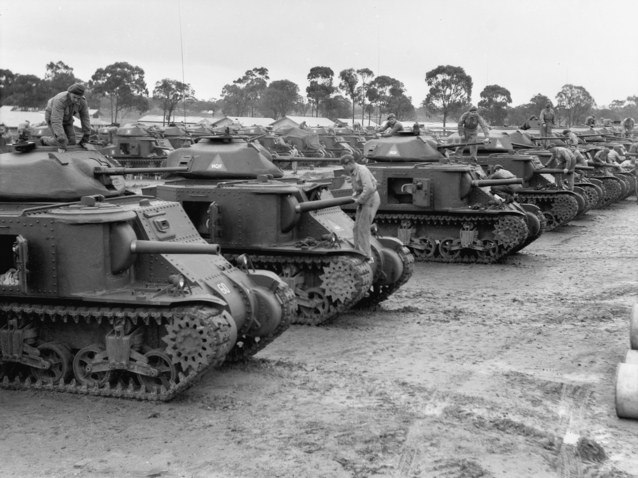
- 1st Armoured Division M3 Grant tanks in June 1942.
- Active: 1941–1943
- Country: Australia
- Branch: Australian Army
- Type: Armoured
- Size: Division
- Battle honours: None

Commanders
- Notable commanders: John Northcott; Horace Robertson

Insignia
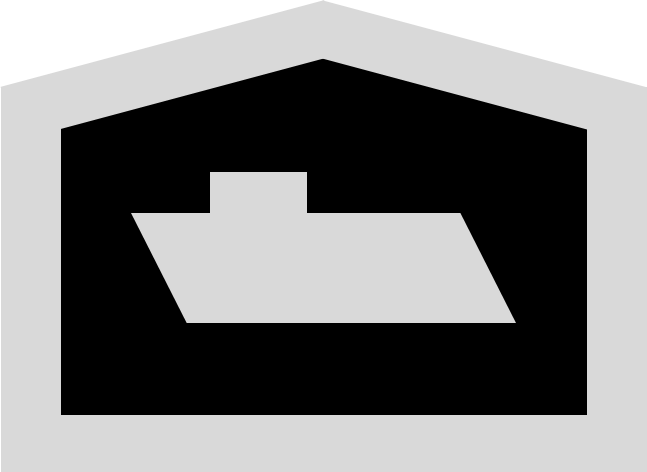
- Unit colour patch

The 1st Armoured Division was an armoured formation of the Australian Army, raised in 1941 as part of the Second Australian Imperial Force (AIF) during World War II. While the Division was originally to be deployed to North Africa in late 1941, it was retained in Australia following the outbreak of the Pacific War. The 1st Armoured Division formed a key element of Australia's defences against a feared Japanese invasion and was disbanded in Western Australia in September 1943.

== History ==
=== Formation ===
The decision to form the 1st Armoured Division was inspired by the success of mass tank tactics in Europe during the early stages of World War II. The Australian War Cabinet approved the formation of an armoured division in July 1940 and the 1st Armoured Division was established on 1 July 1941, under the command of Major General John Northcott. The Australian Armoured Corps was established at the same time, with the corps being formally gazetted on 9 July 1941.

The Division was established with the 1st Armoured Brigade and 2nd Armoured Brigade, each of three armoured regiments. These were supported by various corps troops including an armoured car regiment, a motor regiment (converted from a light horse formation), engineers, a field artillery regiment, an anti-tank battery, and a logistics support group. On paper, each armoured regiment was to be equipped with 10 scout cars, 46 cruiser tanks and six support tanks; while the motor regiment was to be established with 14 scout cars and 44 Universal Carriers, and the armoured car regiment 12 scout cars and 58 armoured cars.

During its early existence, the division faced several challenges. The formation of an armoured division involved a massive expansion of Australia's armoured forces, so the great majority of the division's officers and soldiers had to be trained from scratch in new armoured warfare schools. This process was greatly complicated by the limited number of tanks available to the division, it having only eight light and 10 cruiser tanks by December, and having to use 30 Universal Carriers for training. While the number of tanks available to the division slowly increased, it did not receive its full allocation until May 1942.

=== Defence of Australia ===
Prior to the commencement of the Pacific War with Japan, the 1st Armoured Division had been scheduled to deploy to the Middle East where it would be fully equipped and complete its training: the 1st Armoured Brigade was to embark for the Middle East in December 1941, with the 2nd Armoured Brigade embarking in March 1942. These plans were dropped in early December 1941 when it was decided to retain the division in Australia to defend against a Japanese invasion. As an emergency measure the division's armoured regiments were equipped with Bren Carriers until sufficient tanks arrived.

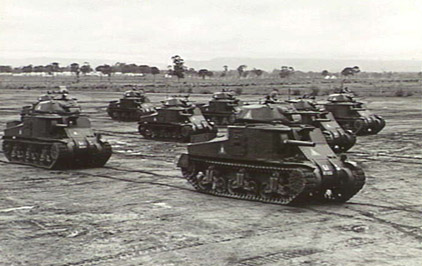
M3 Grants of the 1st Armoured Division at Puckapunyal, June 1942

Major General Horace Robertson replaced Northcott in April 1942 when Northcott was promoted to command the new II Corps. The 1st Armoured Division's armoured regiments were equipped with M3 Grant medium tanks and M3 Stuart light tanks in April and May 1942. Following this, the division was concentrated in northern New South Wales where it completed its training with a series of large exercises around Narrabri. In January 1943, the division was moved to the area between Perth and Geraldton, Western Australia, where it formed part of III Corps to counter the perceived threat of a Japanese invasion of Western Australia.

=== Disbandment ===
Due to the end of the Japanese threat to Australia and the unsuitability of large armoured formations in jungle warfare the 1st Armoured Division no longer had any real role by 1943. By this time, there was a manpower shortage in the Australian Army, which required a re-allocation of personnel and the gradual reduction of Australia's armoured units. While the division was disbanded in September 1943, its 1st Armoured Brigade and other units was retained as the independent 1st Armoured Brigade Group. This brigade group remained part of III Corps in Western Australia until its disbandment in September 1944. The 4th Armoured Brigade, which was established in March 1943 and included several regiments which had formed part of the 1st Armoured Division, provided all the Australian armoured units which saw action from 1943 until the end of the war.

=== Former elements in action ===
While the 1st Armoured Division never saw action as a complete formation, three regiments which were part of the division saw action in the South West Pacific Area, either while assigned to the division, or later. In September 1942, the 2/6th Armoured Regiment, equipped with M3 Stuart light tanks, was deployed to New Guinea, and subsequently saw action during the Battle of Buna–Gona. During 1944–1945, the 2/4th Armoured Regiment contributed squadron-sized elements to the Bougainville campaign and Aitape–Wewak campaigns, equipped with Matilda tanks. The 2/9th Armoured Regiment, also using Matildas, served in the Borneo campaign, including the Australian amphibious landings at Tarakan, Sarawak, Brunei, Labuan and British Borneo in 1945. Other armoured units, such as the 1st Armoured Regiment, which also took part in the Borneo campaign, were Militia units which had not formed part of the 1st Armoured Division.

== Order of battle ==
=== Order of battle upon formation ===
At the time of its formation in July 1941, 1st Armoured Division consisted of:

- Divisional Headquarters
- 2/11 Armoured Car Regiment
- 2/3 Field Squadron, Royal Australian Engineers (RAE)
- 4 Field Squadron, RAE
- 2/1 Field Park Squadron, RAE
- 1st Armoured Brigade
  - 2/5th Armoured Regiment
  - 2/6th Armoured Regiment
  - 2/7th Armoured Regiment
- 2nd Armoured Brigade
  - 2/8th Armoured Regiment
  - 2/9th Armoured Regiment
  - 2/10th Armoured Regiment
- 1st Support Group from February 1942
  - 17th Motor Regiment
  - 108th Anti Tank Regiment, Royal Australian Artillery
  - 16th Field Regiment, Royal Australian Artillery
- Divisional Administration Troops

=== Order of battle upon disbandment ===
At the time of the division's disbandment in September 1943 it consisted of:

- Divisional Headquarters
- 2nd/11 Armoured Car Regiment
- 16 Field Regiment, RAA
- 112 Anti-Tank Regiment, RAA
- 1st Armoured Brigade
  - 2/5 Armoured Regiment
  - 2/7 Armoured Regiment
  - 2/10 Armoured Regiment
  - 15 Motor Regiment
- 3rd Motor Brigade
  - 4 Motor Regiment
  - 26 Motor Regiment
  - 101 Motor Regiment
- Divisional Administration Troops

=== 1st Armoured Brigade Group ===
From September 1943 to September 1944 the division's former 1st Armoured Brigade group served as an independent brigade. In September 1943 the Brigade Group consisted of:

- Brigade Headquarters
- 2/1 Armoured Brigade Reconnaissance Squadron
- 2/5 Armoured Regiment
- 2/7 Armoured Regiment
- 2/10 Armoured Regiment
- 15 Motor Regiment
- Brigade Administration Troops

== See also ==
- Australian armoured units of World War II
