= 2/7th Armoured Regiment (Australia) =

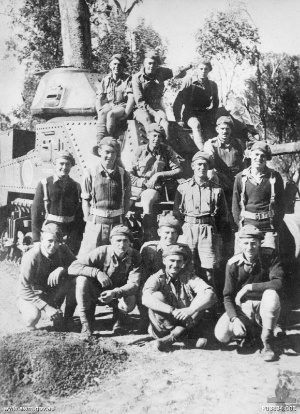
- Members of the 2/7th Armoured Regiment with an M3 Grant tank
- Active: 1941–1944
- Country: Australia
- Branch: Australian Army
- Type: Armoured
- Part of: 1st Armoured Brigade, 1st Armoured Division
- Equipment: M3 Stuart and M3 Grant tanks

Insignia
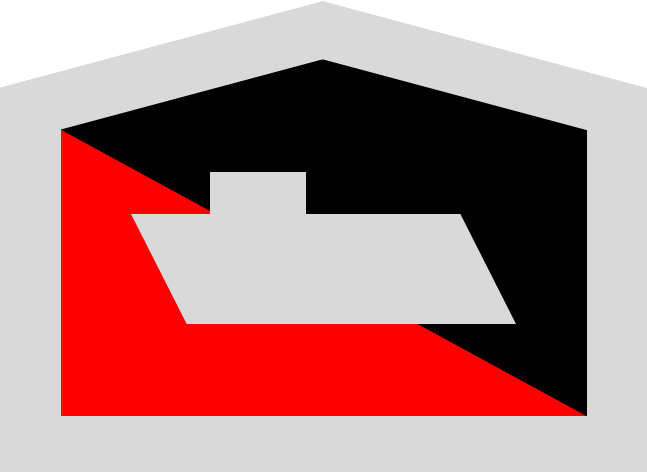
- Unit colour patch

The 2/7th Armoured Regiment was an armoured regiment of the Australian Army. Raised for service during World War II in October 1941, it was initially intended to serve in the Middle East, however due to the changing nature of the war and manpower shortages, the regiment never saw service outside of Australia before being disbanded in January 1944.

== History ==
The 2/7th Armoured Regiment was formed as part of the Second Australian Imperial Force on 9 October 1941 at Greta, New South Wales. Under the command of Lieutenant Colonel P.G.H Cardale, the regiment was assigned to the 1st Armoured Brigade. Upon formation, the regiment was established with a regimental headquarters and three squadrons, designated 'A', 'B' and 'C'. At this time it was believed that the regiment would be deployed to the Middle East where they would be employed against the armoured formations of the German and Italian forces, however, initially there were not enough tanks in Australia with which to equip the newly formed units of the 1st Armoured Division and as a result in December the regiment was equipped with Universal Carriers and wheeled vehicles while it undertook training. It was transferred to Singleton, New South Wales, at this time.

The delay in equipping the units of the 1st Armoured Division meant that their deployment was set back. Initially it had been planned to deploy the 2/7th Armoured Regiment, along with the rest of the 1st Armoured Brigade, in December 1941, however, this was not possible. Shortly thereafter, the Japanese bombing of Pearl Harbor and invasion Malaya meant that the decision was made not to send the 1st Armoured Division to the Middle East as the situation in the Pacific had the potential to directly threaten the Australian mainland. In June 1942 the regiment was re-equipped with M3 Grant tanks and following this, in August, the 2/7th Regiment moved to Edgeroi, New South Wales, where they participated in large-scale armoured exercises. In October and November 'A' Squadron was re-equipped with M3 Stuart light tanks.

During January to March 1943 the 2/7th Armoured Regiment moved to Mingenew, Western Australia, with the rest of the 1st Armoured Division to undertake garrison duties. The changing strategic outlook that following the Allied victories around Buna and on Guadalcanal, coupled with the manpower shortages in the Australian Army and the wider economy at this time led to the disbandment of 1st Armoured Division in September. After this, the 2/7th Armoured Regiment remained in Western Australia and was reassigned to the 1st Armoured Brigade Group. Nevertheless, on 7 January 1944, the 2/7th was also disbanded, having never seen action.

== Commanding officers ==
The following is a list of officers that commanded the 2/7th Armoured Regiment:

- Lieutenant Colonel P.G.H Cardale (October 1941 – February 1942);
- Lieutenant Colonel A.E.L Morgan (February 1942 – April 1943);
- Lieutenant Colonel R.M Wright (April 1943 – January 1944).
