= 1st Armoured Car Squadron (Australia) =

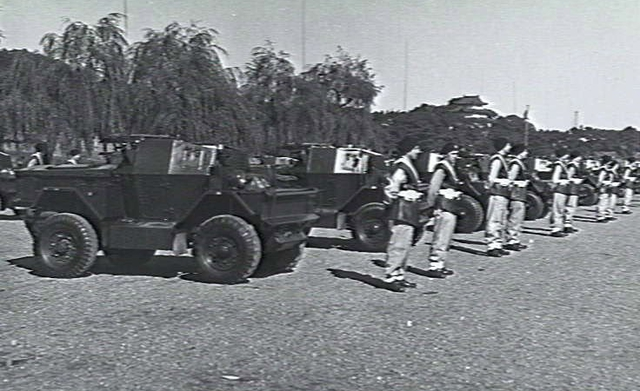
- Members of the 1st Armoured Car Squadron in Tokyo in late 1947
- Active: January 1946 – July 1949
- Country: Australia
- Branch: Australian Army
- Type: Armoured
- Part of: 34th Brigade
- Engagements: Occupation of Japan

The Australian 1st Armoured Car Squadron was an Australian Army unit formed as part of Australia's contribution to the occupation of Japan. Upon its return to Australia in 1948 the Squadron was expanded and re-equipped to form the 1st Armoured Regiment.

== History ==
The 1st Armoured Car Squadron was raised at Puckapunyal, Victoria in January 1946 to form part of the Australian 34th Brigade which was forming at Morotai in the Netherlands East Indies prior to its deployment to Japan. The Squadron was manned by volunteers from the 4th Armoured Brigade and was equipped with 18 Staghound armoured cars and 8 Canadian Scout Cars. After a brief period of training the Squadron embarked for Japan in late March 1946, arriving at Hiroshima on 12 April 1946.

Following the arrival of its armoured cars in early June the 1st Armoured Car Squadron began conducting patrols across the 34th Brigade's area of responsibility. These patrols were generally uneventful and, like almost all of the Allied occupation force, the Squadron did not experience combat. Due to the unsuitability of the Staghounds for Japan's roads the Squadron was completely equipped with Canadian Scout Cars in 1947.

The 1st Armoured Car Squadron returned to Australia in December 1948. In July 1949 the Squadron was expanded and re-equipped with Churchill tanks to form the 1st Armoured Regiment.
