= 2/10th Armoured Regiment (Australia) =

Armoured regiment of the Australian Army

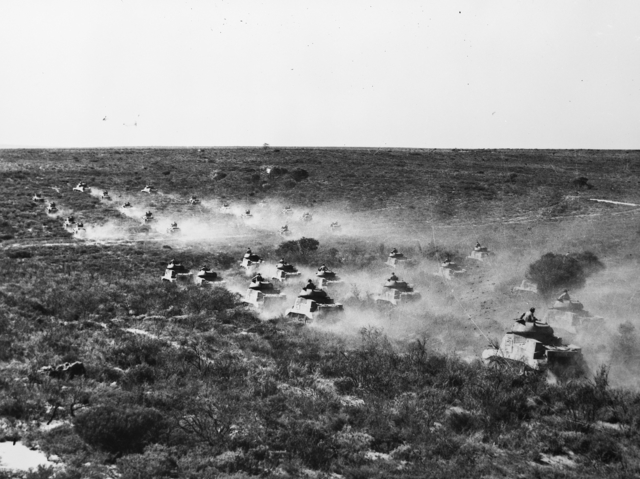
- The 2/10th Armoured Regiment during a training exercise in Western Australia in 1943
- Active: 1941–44
- Country: Australia
- Branch: Australian Army
- Type: Armoured
- Part of: 2nd Armoured Brigade, 1st Armoured Brigade Group
- Equipment: M3 Stuart and M3 Grant tanks
- Battle honours: None

Insignia
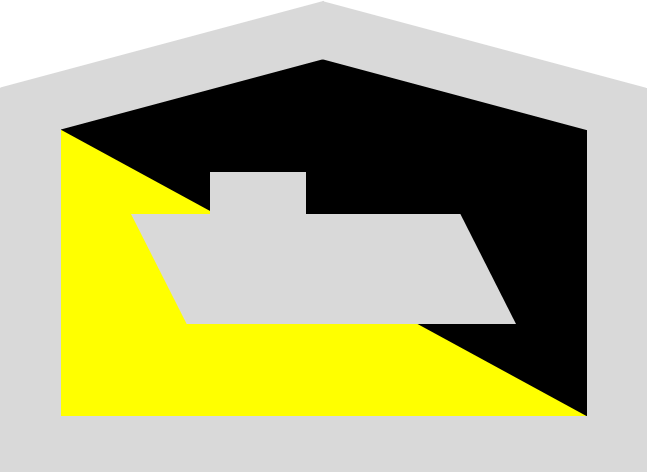
- Unit colour patch

The 2/10th Armoured Regiment was an armoured regiment of the Australian Army. Formed for service during World War II, the regiment was raised in 1941, but was disbanded in late 1944 having never been deployed overseas.

== History ==
The 2/10th Armoured Regiment was formed in Western Australia in July 1941 as part of the 2nd Armoured Brigade of the 1st Armoured Division. Under the command of Lieutenant Colonel K.A Hall, the regiment conducted its initial training at Puckapunyal, Victoria, prior to being equipped with M3 Stuart and M3 Grant tanks. In mid-1942, the 2/10th Armoured was relocated to near Narrabri, New South Wales, where the division conducted large-scale exercises. In November 1942, following the reorganisation of the 1st Armoured Division, the regiment was transferred to the 1st Armoured Brigade to replace the 2/6th Armoured Regiment when that regiment deployed to New Guinea.

By January 1943, manpower shortages in the Australian Army and the changing strategic situation facing the Allies in the Pacific meant that large armoured formations were no longer required. As a result, the decision was made to reduce the size of the 1st Armoured Division. At this time, as part of the 1st Armoured Brigade, the 2/10th Armoured Regiment was relocated to Western Australia to undertake garrison duties. When the 1st Armoured Division was disbanded in September 1943 the regiment survived as part of the independent 1st Armoured Brigade Group. The 2/10th Armoured Regiment was disbanded in September 1944 along with the headquarters of the Brigade Group, and its personnel were reallocated to other units.

== Commanding officers ==
The following is a list of officers that commanded the 2/10th Armoured Regiment:

- Lieutenant Colonel K.A. Hall (July 1941 – April 1942);
- Lieutenant Colonel R.E. Wade (April 1942 – December 1943);
- Lieutenant Colonel G.H. Hardy (December 1943 – February 1944);
- Major H.S. Foley (February – April 1944);
- Lieutenant Colonel J.F.P. Burt (April 1944 – September 1944).
