= 2/6th Armoured Regiment (Australia) =

Armoured regiment of the Australian Army

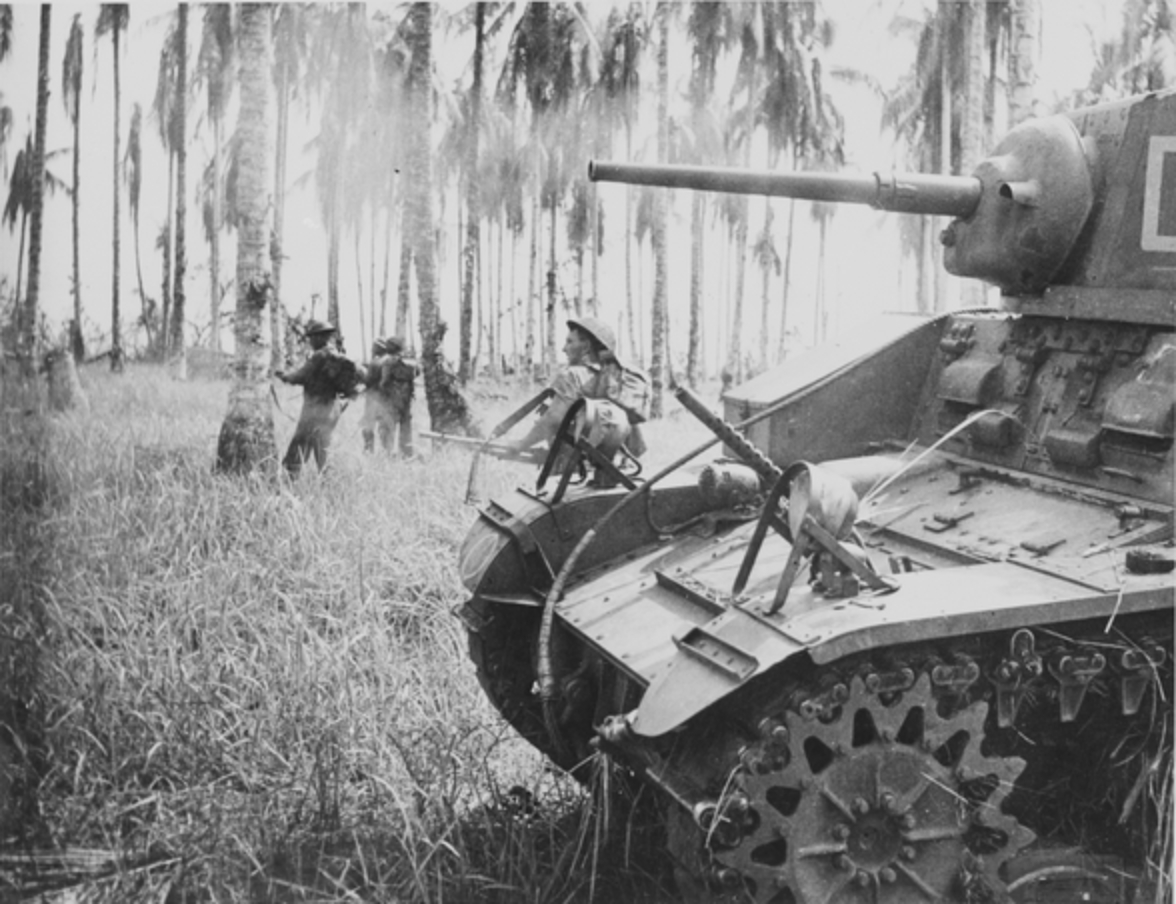
- A 2/6th Armoured Regiment tank supporting infantry during the final assault on Buna
- Active: 1941–1946
- Country: Australia
- Branch: Australian Army
- Type: Armoured
- Equipment: M3 Stuart and M3 Grant tanks
- Engagements: World War II: Battle of Buna–Gona

Insignia
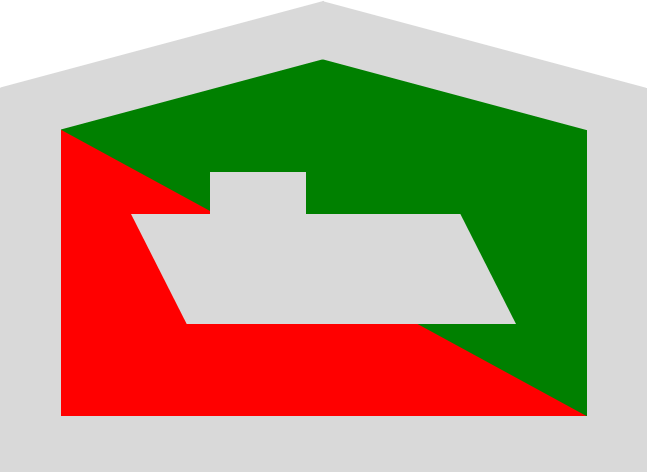
- Unit colour patch

The 2/6th Armoured Regiment was an armoured regiment of the Australian Army that served during World War II. Raised in 1941 the Regiment took part in the Battle of Buna–Gona in 1942–43, however, it did not see further action during the war and was disbanded in September 1945.

== History ==
The 2/6th Armoured Regiment was formed in August 1941 as part of the 1st Armoured Brigade of the 1st Armoured Division. Under the command of Lieutenant Colonel C.R Hodgson, the regiment recruited mainly from the state of New South Wales. It was initially located at Greta, New South Wales, and was equipped with Universal Carriers for training purposes, due to the shortage of other armoured vehicles. Following the outbreak of the Pacific War in December 1941, the regiment was deployed to defend Coffs Harbour against a feared Japanese attack.

In May 1942 the 2/6th Armoured Regiment was moved to Singleton, New South Wales, and was equipped with M3 Stuart light tanks. Later they moved to Narrabri, New South Wales, where they took part in large-scale divisional exercises with the rest of the 1st Armoured Division.

In September 1942, the regiment's 'A' Squadron was deployed to Port Moresby in New Guinea, making the 2/6th the first Australian armoured regiment to be deployed to an operational area in the Pacific theatre. Subsequently, the regimental headquarters and 'C' Squadron were also deployed to Port Moresby, while 'B' Squadron was deployed to Milne Bay in November 1942. During December 1942, 'B' and 'C' Squadrons were shipped to Buna on the north coast of Papua to help break the deadlock in the Battle of Buna–Gona. Although the lightly armoured Stuart tanks proved to be unsuited to jungle warfare and suffered heavy casualties, the regiment played an important role in the eventual Australian victory at Buna. In December, seven tanks were dispatched to take part in the fighting around Cape Endaiadere. Three Stuarts were lost on 18 December, while the other four were knocked out on 24 December when they were engaged by Japanese anti-aircraft artillery from point blank range. Reinforcements were brought up, though, and an attack was put in at Giropa Point on 29 December, although difficult terrain prevented a link up with the infantry. Further attacks occurred in January 1943 around the Sananada Track.

In April 1943 the regiment was relieved and returned to Australia. Upon its return to Australia the 2/6th Armoured Regiment was incorporated into the 4th Armoured Brigade, which was the Australian Army's specialist jungle armoured formation. The regiment was transferred to the 1st Armoured Brigade Group in Western Australia in early 1943, however, and did not see further combat. After the 1st Armoured Brigade Group was disbanded in September 1944 due to manpower shortages and the decreasing strategic need for armour, the regiment operated as an independent formation until it rejoined the 4th Armoured Brigade in July 1945.

Following the end of hostilities, the 2/6th Armoured Regiment was disbanded in February 1946. During the course of its service it lost 15 men killed in action or died on active service, while members of the regiment received the following awards: one Military Cross, one Military Medal and seven Mention in Despatches.

== Commanding officers ==
- Charles Ralph Hodgson (July 1941 – December 1942)
- Norman Lewis Moss (December 1942 – January 1943)
- James Baker McBean (January 1943 – February 1945)
- John Frederick Page Burt (February 1945 – September 1945).

== Battle honours ==
For its service during World War II the 2/6th Armoured Regiment received three battle honours, these were:

- South-West Pacific 1942–43, Buna–Gona, Cape Endaiadere–Sinemi Creek.
