= 1st Royal New South Wales Lancers =

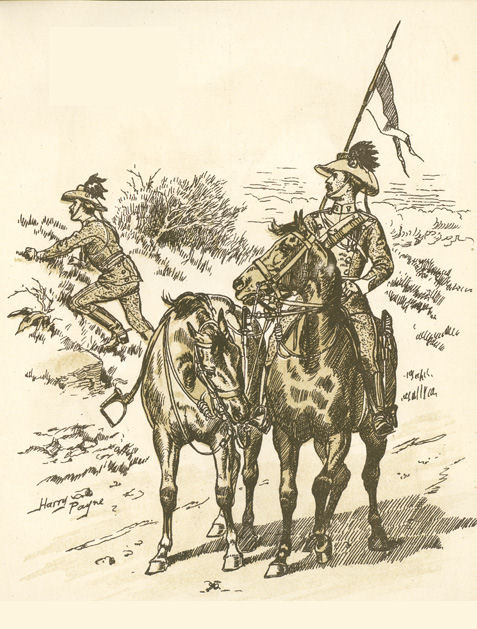
- New South Wales Lancers
- Active: 1885–1956
- Country: Australia
- Branch: Australian Army
- Type: Line cavalry
- Size: Regiment
- Garrison/HQ: Parramatta, New South Wales
- Engagements: Second Boer War; First World War; Second World War

Insignia
- Cap badge 1st Royal New South Wales Lancers

The 1st Royal New South Wales Lancers was an Australian Army light cavalry (reconnaissance) regiment. Its complicated lineage includes the New South Wales Lancers which was first formed as a colonial unit in 1885 as the New South Wales Cavalry, and subsequently saw action in the Second Boer War, and later during First World War at Gallipoli and Palestine as the 1st Light Horse Regiment. The unit subsequently served during the Second World War as the 1st Armoured Regiment equipped with Matilda tanks, fighting the Japanese in New Guinea and Borneo.

The Lancers was reformed after the Second World War in 1948 as a reserve formation in the Citizens Military Forces (CMF) known as the 1st Armoured Regiment (Royal New South Wales Lancers). In 1949, the regiment was renamed the 1st Royal New South Wales Lancers however, to reallocate the former name to the tank regiment that was to be established in the new Australian Regular Army. In 1956, the 1st Royal New South Wales Lancers was merged with the 15th Northern River Lancers to create the 1st/15th Royal New South Wales Lancers, a unit which continues to serve today in the Australian Army Reserve.

== History ==
=== Second Boer War ===
The unit's complicated lineage included the New South Wales Lancers, which had been first formed as the New South Wales Cavalry, a reserve colonial unit in 1885 and had later served in the Second Boer War. A half squadron of the Regiment had been in Great Britain where they participated in the Diamond Jubilee of Queen Victoria. When war was declared they were transported to South Africa. The Lancers contributed a squadron that had served under John French in Lord Roberts' army, and participated in a counter-invasion of the Orange Free State that eventually lifted the Siege of Kimberley in 1900.

=== First World War and inter-war years ===
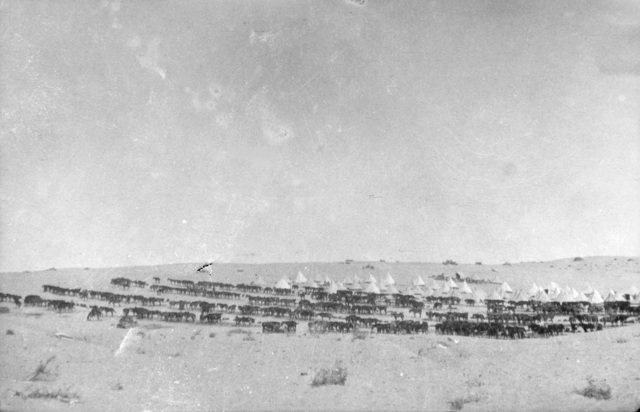
1st Light Horse Regiment in the Sinai Desert

In August 1914, following the outbreak of the First World War, the 1st Light Horse Regiment was formed at Rosebury Park in Sydney, as part of the raising of a 20,000-man expeditionary force known as the Australian Imperial Force (AIF). The new regiment was raised mainly from volunteers of the 7th Australian Light Horse (New South Wales Lancers), an existing militia unit based in Sydney and on the New South Wales south coast.

Unit colour patch of the 1st Light Horse Regiment

Upon establishment, the men from the 7th ALH formed the bulk of Regimental Headquarters, and A and B Squadrons, while AIF volunteers made up the remainder of the new unit. Among them were veterans of the New South Wales Lancers who had fought in South Africa. Sailing from Sydney on 19 October, the 1st Light Horse disembarked in Egypt on 8 December 1914 and later went on to fight in Gallipoli, after being dispatched there in May 1915 with the 1st Light Horse Brigade. Serving in a dismounted role, they reinforced the New Zealand and Australian Division around Anzac Cove, and undertook mainly defensive tasks. In August, the regiment mounted a diversionary assault around a position dubbed "the Chessboard", where they suffered heavy casualties. After withdrawal from Gallipoli in December 1915, the regiment returned to a mounted role and was assigned to the Anzac Mounted Division. After defensive duties around the Suez Canal, the regiment joined the Sinai and Palestine campaign against Turkish forces. Its first battle came at Romani. It was followed by numerous others over the next two-and-a-half years, including Maghdaba, Rafa, Gaza, Jaffa, Es Salt, before the war end in late 1918.

The regiment returned to Australia in mid-1919, and the AIF was disbanded in 1921. Serving in the part-time Citizens Force (later known as the "Militia") after the war, the Lancers was designated as successor to the 1st Light Horse Regiment, and they consequently inherited the former unit's battle honours. The regiment continued as the 1st Light Horse Regiment until 1929, its ranks augmented with conscripts. In 1929, universal service ended, and the unit was linked with the 21st Light Horse to become the 1st/21st Light Horse (New South Wales Lancers) in the wake of the Great Depression. In 1935, the regiment received the prefix "Royal", while the 1st and 21st Light Horse were uncoupled the following year. The unit was subsequently converted into a motorised machine-gun regiment, and was renamed the 1st Light Horse (Machine Gun) Regiment (Royal New South Wales Lancers).

=== Second World War ===
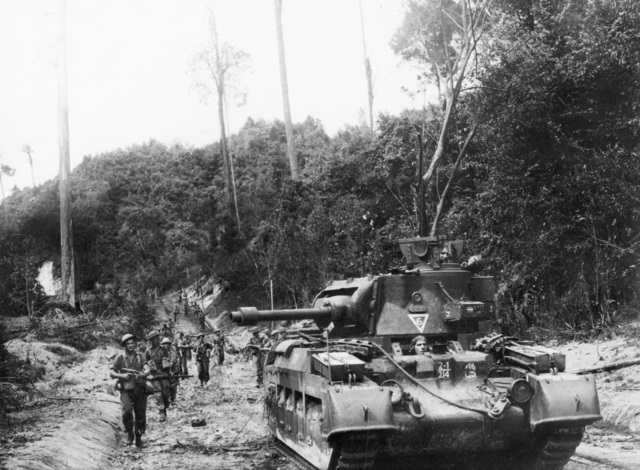
An Australian Matilda Frog flamethrower tank in Borneo, 1945.

At the start of the Second World War, due to the limitations of the Defence Act (1903), which prevented the government from sending the Militia to fight outside Australian territory, it was decided to raise an all volunteer force to serve overseas. This force was known as the Second Australian Imperial Force (2nd AIF), and many of the 1st Light Horse (Machine Gun) Regiment's members volunteered. Assigned to the 2/2nd Machine Gun Battalion, they took part in the fighting in the Mediterranean theatre. In December 1941 the regiment became the 1st Machine Gun Regiment and was given its first operational role securing the northern Newcastle beaches as part of the Newcastle Covering Force.

In March 1942, the regiment was again renamed, being converted to the 1st Motor Regiment. This change was short lived however, and it was changed again in May to the 1st Tank Battalion, becoming part of the 3rd Army Tank Brigade, equipped with Matilda tanks. In 1943 the unit became part of the 4th Armoured Brigade and was designated as an AIF unit, thus allowing it to be deployed to any theatre of the conflict. Later, after completing training in Caboolture, Queensland it deployed to New Guinea in August 1943 where it supported the 9th Division fighting the Japanese 20th Division around Lae, on the Huon Peninsula and around Finschhafen, Sattelberg and Lakona. The unit was then withdrawn to Australia in mid-1944. During the fighting the tanks had performed well, and despite the difficult jungle terrain, the suitability of the Matilda for such operations had been proven with the Australians effectively employing combined arms tactics against which the Japanese had no effective response.

On 1 June 1944, the unit was renamed the 1st Armoured Regiment. The unit then spent the next year in training, and during this time it was based at Southport, Queensland. In May 1945, it took part in the amphibious landings at Balikpapan in support of the 7th Division, being involved in one of the final Australian campaigns of the war in Borneo. The landings took place on 1 July 1945 and had been preceded by heavy bombing and shelling by Australian and US air and naval forces. Landing with the infantry, the tanks—including newly modified Matilda Frog flamethrower tanks—mainly operated in small detachments in close support of the troops, even though the terrain offered the opportunity for more mobile tactics to be employed. Although the Australians were ultimately successful, casualties among the infantry were heavy and during this time the regiment was involved in some hard fighting, with the Japanese able to make effective use of strong natural defences in conjunction with minefields and anti-tank ditches to compensate for their lack of anti-tank guns. With the fighting coming to a conclusion however, tank operations ceased on 24 July. In total, casualties suffered by the regiment during the war included 14 dead.

=== Post-war era ===
Following the end of the war the Australian Army was demobilised. In 1948, the Citizens Military Forces (CMF) was re-raised, albeit on a reduced establishment of two divisions. As a part of this force, the regiment was reconstituted as a reserve formation on 1 April 1948, adopting the designation of the 1st Armoured Regiment (Royal New South Wales Lancers), in recognition of its previous history. During this time the regiment continued to operate Matilda tanks and was based at Lancer Barracks in Parramatta, in New South Wales. However, in 1949 the regiment was renamed the 1st Royal New South Wales Lancers and its battle honours and history were perpetuated by this unit, to reallocate the former name to the tank regiment that was to be established in the new Australian Regular Army. (Note: See 1st Armoured Regiment (Australia).) Later, in 1956 the 1st Royal New South Wales Lancers merged with the 15th Northern River Lancers to form the 1st/15th Royal New South Wales Lancers, equipped with a small number of Centurion tanks. This unit continues to serve today as a part-time unit in the Australian Army Reserve, operating Bushmaster Protected Mobility Vehicles (PMV) in the Light Cavalry (Reconnaissance) role.

== Battle honours ==
The regiment has received the following battle honours:

- Boer War: South Africa 1899–1902;
- First World War: Anzac, Defence of Anzac, Suvla, Sari Bair, Gallipoli, Romani, Magdhaba–Rafah, Egypt 1915–17, Gaza–Beersheba, El Mughar, Nebi Samwil, Jerusalem, Jaffa, Jericho, Jordan (Es Salt), Jordan (Amman), Megiddo, Nablus, Palestine 1917–18;
- Second World War: South-West Pacific 1943–45, Finschhafen, Sattelberg, Wareo, Liberation of Australian New Guinea, Wareo–Lakona, Gusika–Fortification Point, Borneo, Balikpapan, and Milford Highway.

== Notes ==
Footnotes

Citations
