= List of Australian Army units =

In March 1901, the Australian Army came into existence as the Commonwealth Military Forces through the amalgamation of the former colonies military forces. The existing regiments and battalions of the colonies were reorganised and renumbered due to their absorption into the national army and subsequently formed the first military units of a united Australia. At the outbreak of World War I, in July 1914, the Australian Government committed the First Australian Imperial Force (AIF), a fully volunteer force, to the war; all existing units were exempt from serving overseas due the Defence Act 1903, which stipulated that they could only serve in Australian territory.

In 1921, the Citizens Force's regimental numbering system, used since federation, was replaced by a divisional structure when the Australian Government decided to continue the unit designations of the AIF and to continue the traditions of the units of World War I. This renumbering brought about the end of localised regiments, with battalions taking up their role as community recruitment organisations.

In 1939, following the start of World War II the Australian Government created the Second Australian Imperial Force which would see combat in North Africa and the Pacific.

This list covers individual units, above or equivalent to a battalion, which were created or maintained after 1914, by either being militia units that were amalgamated and/or renumbered or being entirely new entities.

== Armies ==
The field army has been the largest ever created unit for the Australian Army and has only been utilised in the Second World War.

=== Former Armies ===
- First Army
- Second Army

== Corps ==
In the history of the Australian Army, only during the world wars were tactical corps units raised.

=== Former Corps ===
- Australian Corps
- Australian and New Zealand Army Corps
- I ANZAC Corps
- II ANZAC Corps
- I Corps
- II Corps
- III Corps

== Divisions ==
=== Active Divisions ===
- 1st Division
- 2nd Division

=== Former Divisions ===
==== Former Infantry and Mixed Divisions ====
- 3rd Division
- 4th Division
- 5th Division
- 6th Division
- 7th Division
- 8th Division
- 9th Division
- 10th Division
- 11th Division
- 12th Division (Note: Briefly called the 12th Division, otherwise known as the Northern Territory Force)
- New Zealand and Australian Division

==== Former Light Horse Divisions ====
- ANZAC Mounted Division
- Australian Mounted Division

==== Former Armoured Divisions ====
- 1st Armoured Division
- 2nd Armoured Division (Note: Originally called the 2nd Cavalry Division and 2nd Motor Division)
- 3rd Armoured Division (Note: Originally called the 1st Cavalry Division and 1st Motor Division)

==== Former Cavalry Divisions ====
- 1st Calavry Division (Note: Later renamed to the 1st Motor Division and 3rd Armoured Division)
- 2nd Cavalry Division (Note: Later renamed to the 2nd Motor Division and 2nd Armoured Division)

==== Former Motor Divisions ====
- 1st Motor Division (Note: Originally called the 1st Cavalry Division and later called the 3rd Armoured Division)
- 2nd Motor Division (Note: Originally called the 2nd Cavalry Division and later called the 2nd Armoured Division)

== Brigades ==
=== Active Brigades ===
==== Infantry and Mixed Brigades ====
- 1st Brigade
- 2nd Brigade
- 3rd Brigade
- 4th Brigade
- 5th Brigade
- 7th Brigade
- 8th Brigade
- 9th Brigade
- 10th Brigade
- 11th Brigade
- 13th Brigade
- 17th Sustainment Brigade

==== Aviation Brigades ====
- 16th Aviation Brigade

=== Former Brigades ===
==== Former Infantry and Mixed Brigades ====
- 6th Brigade
- 12th Brigade
- 14th Brigade
- 15th Brigade
- 16th Brigade
- 17th Brigade
- 18th Brigade
- 19th Brigade
- 20th Brigade
- 21st Brigade
- 22nd Brigade
- 23rd Brigade
- 24th Brigade
- 25th Brigade
- 26th Brigade
- 27th Brigade
- 28th Brigade
- 29th Brigade
- 30th Brigade
- 31st Brigade
- 32nd Brigade
- 33rd Brigade
- 34th Brigade

==== Former Motor Brigades ====
- 1st Motor Brigade (Note: Originally called the 1st Cavalry Brigade)
- 2nd Motor Brigade (Note: Originally called the 2nd Cavalry Brigade)
- 3rd Motor Brigade (Note: Originally called the 3rd Cavalry Brigade)
- 4th Motor Brigade (Note: Originally called the 4th Cavalry Brigade)
- 5th Motor Brigade (Note: Originally called the 5th Cavalry Brigade)
- 6th Motor Brigade (Note: Originally called the 6th Cavalry Brigade)

==== Former Light Horse and Cavalry Brigades ====
- 1st Cavalry Brigade (Note: Originally called the 1st Light Horse Brigade, later renamed to the 1st Motor Brigade)
- 2nd Cavalry Brigade (Note: Renamed to the 2nd Motor Brigade)
- 3rd Cavalry Brigade (Note: Renamed to the 3rd Motor Brigade)
- 4th Cavalry Brigade (Note: Renamed to the 4th Motor Brigade)
- 5th Cavalry Brigade (Note: Renamed to the 5th Motor Brigade)
- 6th Cavalry Brigade (Note: Renamed to the 6th Motor Brigade] and later the 6th Armoured Brigade)

==== Former Armoured Brigades ====
- 1st Armoured Brigade
- 2nd Armoured Brigade
- 3rd Army Tank Brigade
- 4th Armoured Brigade
- 6th Armoured Brigade

== Regiments ==
=== Active Regiments ===
==== Active Infantry Regiments ====
- Royal Australian Regiment
- Royal New South Wales Regiment
- Royal Victoria Regiment
- Royal Queensland Regiment
- Royal South Australia Regiment
- Royal Western Australia Regiment
- Royal Tasmania Regiment
- 1st Commando Regiment
- 2nd Commando Regiment
- Special Air Service Regiment (SASR)
- Pilbara Regiment
- NORFORCE
- Far North Queensland Regiment

==== Active Training Regiments ====
- Adelaide Universities Regiment
- Melbourne University Regiment
- Queensland University Regiment
- Sydney University Regiment
- University of New South Wales Regiment
- Western Australia University Regiment

==== Active Engineer Regiments ====
- 1st Combat Engineer Regiment
- 2nd Combat Engineer Regiment
- 3rd Combat Engineer Regiment
- 5th Engineer Regiment (Note: Originally called the 5th Combat Engineer Regiment)
- 6th Engineer Support Regiment
- 9th Combat Engineer Regiment
- 11th Engineer Regiment
- 13th Engineer Regiment
- 22nd Engineer Regiment (Note: Originally called the 22nd Construction Regiment)
- Special Operations Engineer Regiment

==== Active Armoured Regiments ====
- 1st Armoured Regiment
- 2nd Cavalry Regiment (Note: Originally called the 1st Cavalry Regiment)
- 3rd/4th Cavalry Regiment
- 1st/15th Royal New South Wales Lancers
- 2nd/14th Light Horse Regiment
- 3rd/9th Light Horse Regiment
- 4th/19th Prince of Wales's Light Horse
- 10th Light Horse Regiment
- 12th/16th Hunter River Lancers

==== Active Artillery Regiments ====
- 1st Regiment, Royal Australian Artillery
- 4th Regiment, Royal Australian Artillery
- 8th/12th Regiment, Royal Australian Artillery
- 9th Regiment, Royal Australian Artillery
- 14th Regiment, Royal Australian Artillery
- 16th Regiment, Royal Australian Artillery
- 20th Regiment, Royal Australian Artillery

==== Active Aviation Regiments ====
- 1st Aviation Regiment
- 5th Aviation Regiment
- 6th Aviation Regiment

==== Active Signal Regiments ====
- 1st Signal Regiment
- 1st Combat Signal Regiment
- 3rd Combat Signal Regiment
- 7th Signal Regiment
- 7th Combat Signal Regiment
- 8th Signal Regiment

=== Former Regiments ===
==== Former Infantry Regiments ====
- Pacific Islands Regiment (Note: Upon Papua New Guniea Independence, the regiment become part of the PNGDF)

==== Former University Regiments ====
- Monash University Regiment (Note: Amalgamated with Melbourne University Regiment)

==== Former Engineer Regiments ====
- 4th Combat Engineer Regiment (Note: Amalgamated with 22nd Construction Regiment to form 22nd Engineer Regiment (Australia))
- 8th Engineer Regiment (Note: Originally called the 8th Combat Engineer Regiment) (Note: Amalgamated with 5th Engineer Regiment to form 5th Engineer Regiment (Australia))
- 21st Construction Regiment (Note: Amalgamated with 8th Combat Engineer Regiment to form 8th Engineer Regiment (Australia) and the 5th Combat Engineer Regiment to form the 5th Engineer Regiment)
- 22nd Construction Regiment (Note: Renamed to the 22nd Engineer Regiment)

==== Former Light Horse Regiments ====
- 3rd Cavalry Regiment (Note: Amalgamated with 4th Cavalry Regiment to form 3rd/4th Cavalry Regiment (Australia))
- 4th Cavalry Regiment (Note: Amalgamated with 3rd Cavalry Regiment to form 3rd/4th Cavalry Regiment (Australia))
- 1st Royal New South Wales Lancers (Note: Amalgamated with 15th Light Horse Regiment to form 1st/15th Royal New South Wales Lancers)
- 2nd Light Horse Regiment (Note: Amalgamated with 14th Light Horse Regiment to form 2nd/14th Light Horse Regiment)
- 3rd Light Horse Regiment (Note: Amalgamated with 9th Light Horse Regiment to form 3rd/9th Light Horse (South Australian Mounted Rifles))
- 4th Light Horse Regiment (Note: Amalgamated with 19th Light Horse Regiment to form 4th/19th Prince of Wales's Light Horse)
- 5th Light Horse Regiment
- 6th Light Horse Regiment
- 7th Light Horse Regiment
- 8th Light Horse Regiment
- 9th Light Horse Regiment (Note: Amalgamated with 3rd Light Horse Regiment to form 3rd/9th Light Horse (South Australian Mounted Rifles))
- 9th/23rd Light Horse Regiment
- 11th Light Horse Regiment
- 12th Light Horse Regiment
- 13th Light Horse Regiment
- 14th Light Horse Regiment (Note: Amalgamated with 2nd Light Horse Regiment to form 2nd/14th Light Horse Regiment)
- 15th Light Horse Regiment (Note: Amalgamated with 1st Royal New South Wales Lancers to form 1st/15th Royal New South Wales Lancers)
- 16th Light Horse Regiment
- 17th Light Horse Regiment
- 18th Light Horse Regiment
- 18th/23rd Light Horse Regiment
- 19th Light Horse Regiment (Note: Amalgamated with 4th Light Horse Regiment to form 4th/19th Prince of Wales's Light Horse)
- 20th Light Horse Regiment (Note: Renamed to the 20th Motor Regiment and was later renamed to the 20th Pioneer Battalion)
- 21st Light Horse Regiment
- 22nd Light Horse Regiment
- 23rd Light Horse Regiment
- 24th Light Horse Regiment
- 25th Light Horse Regiment

==== Former Armoured Regiments ====
- 2/4th Armoured Regiment
- 2/5th Armoured Regiment
- 2/6th Armoured Regiment
- 2/7th Armoured Regiment
- 2/8th Armoured Regiment
- 2/9th Armoured Regiment
- 2/10th Armoured Regiment
- 2/11th Armoured Car Regiment

==== Former Artillery Regiments ====
- 2nd Field Regiment, Royal Australian Artillery
- 2nd/10th Field Regiment, Royal Australian Artillery
- 2nd/15th Field Regiment, Royal Australian Artillery
- 8th Medium Regiment, Royal Australian Artillery
- 10th Medium Regiment, Royal Australian Artillery
- 12th Field Regiment, Royal Australian Artillery
- 13th Field Regiment, Royal Australian Artillery
- 15th Field Regiment, Royal Australian Artillery
- 18th Field Regiment, Royal Australian Artillery
- 22nd Field Regiment, Royal Australian Artillery
- 23rd Regiment, Royal Australian Artillery (Note: Originally called the 3rd Anti-Tank Regiment, 3rd Light Regiment, 23rd Light Regiment, 23rd Field Regiment)
- 2/1st Field Regiment
- 2/1st Anti-Tank Regiment
- 2/1st Medium Regiment
- 2/2nd Field Regiment
- 2/2nd Anti-Tank Regiment
- 2/3rd Field Regiment
- 2/3rd Anti-Tank Regiment
- 2/4th Field Regiment
- 2/4th Anti-Tank Regiment
- 2/5th Field Regiment
- 2/6th Field Regiment
- 2/7th Field Regiment
- 2/8th Field Regiment
- 2/9th Field Regiment
- 2/10th Field Regiment
- 2/11th Field Regiment
- 2/12th Field Regiment
- 2/14th Field Regiment
- 2/15th Field Regiment

==== Former Motor Regiments ====
- 3rd Motor Regiment
- 4th Motor Regiment
- 5th Motor Regiment
- 9th Motor Regiment
- 11th Motor Regiment
- 12th Motor Regiment
- 16th Motor Regiment
- 20th Motor Regiment (Note: Originally called the 20th Light Horse regiment and was later renamed to the 20th Pioneer Battalion)

== Battalions ==
=== Active Battalions ===
==== Active Infantry Battalions ====
- 1st Battalion, Royal Australian Regiment (Note: Originally the 65th Battalion)
- 2nd Battalion, Royal Australian Regiment (Note: Originally the 66th Battalion)
- 3rd Battalion, Royal Australian Regiment (Note: Originally the 67th Battalion)
- 5th/7th Battalion, Royal Australian Regiment
- 6th Battalion, Royal Australian Regiment
- 8th/9th Battalion, Royal Australian Regiment
- 1st/19th Battalion, Royal New South Wales Regiment
- 2nd/17th Battalion, Royal New South Wales Regiment
- 4th/3rd Battalion, Royal New South Wales Regiment
- 5th/6th Battalion, Royal Victoria Regiment
- 8th/7th Battalion, Royal Victoria Regiment
- 9th Battalion, Royal Queensland Regiment
- 10th/27th Battalion, Royal South Australia Regiment
- 11th/28th Battalion, Royal Western Australia Regiment
- 12th/40th Battalion, Royal Tasmainian Regiment
- 16th Battalion, Royal Western Australia Regiment
- 25th/49th Battalion, Royal Queensland Regiment
- 31st/42nd Battalion, Royal Queensland Regiment
- 41st Battalion, Royal New South Wales Regiment
- 51st Battalion, Far North Queensland Regiment

==== Active Health Support Battalions ====
- 1st Health Battalion
- 2nd Health Battalion
- 3rd Health Battalion
- 4th Health Battalion

==== Active Support Battalions ====
- 1st Combat Service Support Battalion
- 3rd Combat Service Support Battalion
- 4th Combat Service Support Battalion
- 5th Combat Service Support Battalion
- 7th Combat Service Support Battalion
- 8th Operational Support Unit
- 9th Force Support Battalion
- 9th Combat Service Support Battalion
- 10th Force Support Battalion
- 11th Combat Service Support Battalion
- 13th Combat Service Support Battalion
- 39th Operational Support Battalion

=== Former Battalions ===
==== Former Infantry Battalions ====
- 1st Battalion (Note: Currently amalgamated with the 19th Battalion to form the 1st/19th Battalion)
- 1st/45th Battalion
- 2nd Battalion
- 2nd/35th Battalion
- 3rd Battalion
- 3rd/22nd Battalion
- 4th Battalion
- 5th Battalion
- 6th Battalion
- 7th Battalion
- 8th Battalion
- 9th/49th Battalion
- 10th Battalion
- 10th/48th Battalion
- 10th/50th Battalion
- 11th Battalion
- 11th/12th Battalion
- 11th/16th Battalion
- 11th/44th Battalion
- 12th Battalion
- 12th/50th Battalion
- 13th Battalion
- 13th/33rd Battalion
- 14th Battalion
- 14th/32nd Battalion
- 15th Battalion
- 15th/26th Battalion
- 16th/28th Battalion
- 17th Battalion
- 17th/18th Battalion
- 18th Battalion
- 18th/51st Battalion
- 19th Battalion
- 20th Battalion
- 20th/19th Battalion
- 20th/34th Battalion
- 21st Battalion
- 22nd Battalion
- 23rd Battalion
- 23rd/21st Battalion
- 24th Battalion
- 24th/39th Battalion
- 25th Battalion
- 26th Battalion
- 27th Battalion
- 28th Battalion
- 29th Battalion
- 29th/22nd Battalion
- 29th/46th Battalion
- 30th Battalion
- 30th/51st Battalion
- 31st Battalion
- 31st/51st Battalion
- 32nd Battalion
- 33rd Battalion
- 33rd/41st Battalion
- 34th Battalion
- 35th Battalion
- 35th/33rd Battalion
- 36th Battalion
- 37th Battalion
- 37th/39th Battalion
- 37th/52nd Battalion
- 38th Battalion
- 39th Battalion
- 40th Battalion
- 42nd Battalion
- 43rd Battalion
- 43rd/48th Battalion
- 44th Battalion
- 45th Battalion
- 46th Battalion
- 47th Battalion
- 48th Battalion
- 49th Battalion
- 50th Battalion
- 52nd Battalion
- 53rd Battalion
- 54th Battalion
- 55th Battalion
- 55th/53rd Battalion
- 56th Battalion
- 57th Battalion
- 57th/60th Battalion
- 58th Battalion
- 58th/32nd Battalion
- 58th/59th Battalion
- 59th Battalion
- 60th Battalion
- 61st Battalion
- 62nd Battalion
- 63rd Battalion
- 64th Battalion
- 65th Battalion
- 66th Battalion
- 67th Battalion
- 68th Battalion
- 69th Battalion
- 70th Battalion (Note: Renamed to the 2/31st Battalion)
- 71st Battalion (Note: Renamed to the 2/32nd Battalion)
- 72nd Battalion (Note: Renamed to the 2/33rd Battalion)
- 2/1st Battalion
- 2/2nd Battalion
- 2/3rd Battalion
- 2/4th Battalion
- 2/5th Battalion
- 2/6th Battalion
- 2/7th Battalion
- 2/8th Battalion
- 2/9th Battalion
- 2/10th Battalion
- 2/11th Battalion
- 2/12th Battalion
- 2/13th Battalion
- 2/14th Battalion
- 2/15th Battalion
- 2/16th Battalion
- 2/17th Battalion
- 2/18th Battalion
- 2/19th Battalion
- 2/20th Battalion
- 2/21st Battalion
- 2/22nd Battalion
- 2/23rd Battalion
- 2/24th Battalion
- 2/25th Battalion
- 2/26th Battalion
- 2/27th Battalion
- 2/28th Battalion
- 2/29th Battalion
- 2/30th Battalion
- 2/31st Battalion (Note: Originally called the 70th Battalion)
- 2/32nd Battalion (Note: Originally called the 71st Battalion)
- 2/33rd Battalion (Note: Originally called the 72nd Battalion)
- 2/40th Battalion
- 2/43rd Battalion
- 2/48th Battalion
- 2nd/4th Battalion, Royal Australian Regiment
- 4th Battalion, Royal Australian Regiment (Note: Reorganised into the 2nd Commando Regiment)
- 5th Battalion, Royal Australian Regiment (Note: Amalgamated with 7 RAR to form 5th/7th Battalion, Royal Australian Regiment)
- 7th Battalion, Royal Australian Regiment (Note: Amalgamated with 5 RAR to form 5th/7th Battalion, Royal Australian Regiment)
- 8th Battalion, Royal Australian Regiment (Note: Amalgamated with 9 RAR to form 8th/9th Battalion, Royal Australian Regiment)
- 9th Battalion, Royal Australian Regiment (Note: Amalgamated with 8 RAR to form 8th/9th Battalion, Royal Australian Regiment)
- Torres Strait Light Infantry Battalion

==== Former New Guinea Infantry Battalions ====
- 1st New Guinea Infantry Battalion
- 2nd New Guinea Infantry Battalion
- 3rd New Guinea Infantry Battalion
- 4th New Guinea Infantry Battalion
- New Guinea Volunteer Rifles
- Papuan Infantry Battalion

==== Former Parachute Battalions ====
- 1st Parachute Battalion

==== Former Support Battalions ====
- 2nd Force Support Battalion
- 8th Combat Service Support Battalion

==== Former Machine Gun Battalions ====
- 1st Machine Gun Battalion
- 2nd Machine Gun Battalion
- 3rd Machine Gun Battalion
- 4th Machine Gun Battalion
- 5th Machine Gun Battalion
- 6th Machine Gun Battalion
- 7th Machine Gun Battalion
- 19th Machine Gun Battalion
- 2/1st Machine Gun Battalion
- 2/2nd Machine Gun Battalion
- 2/3rd Machine Gun Battalion
- 2/4th Machine Gun Battalion

==== Former Pioneer Battalions ====
- 1st Pioneer Battalion
- 2nd Pioneer Battalion
- 3rd Pioneer Battalion
- 4th Pioneer Battalion
- 5th Pioneer Battalion
- 6th Pioneer Battalion
- 7th Pioneer Battalion
- 20th Pioneer Battalion (Note: Formerly called the 20th Motor Regiment)
- 2/1st Pioneer Battalion
- 2/2nd Pioneer Battalion
- 2/3rd Pioneer Battalion
- 2/4th Pioneer Battalion

==== Former Entrenching Battalions ====
- 1st Anzac Entrenching Battalion

== See also ==
- Independent Rifle Company
