= List of British Commonwealth and Empire brigades of the Second World War =

This is a list of army brigades of the British Commonwealth and Empire during the Second World War.

These brigades were often part of larger military formations composed of units from the United Kingdom, Dominions, British India and Crown Colonies. At the time, despite their multi-national composition, such formations were often referred as "British".

The territories and peoples comprising many countries mentioned below have changed since the war; in some cases the names of countries have changed or do not correspond to modern country names.

In the list below:

- "formed from" indicates that a brigade was created in part from another unit and;
- "formerly" indicates a simple unit/name change.

== Australia ==
- 1st Anti-Aircraft Brigade
- 1st Armoured Brigade
- 2nd Armoured Brigade
- 3rd Army Tank Brigade
- 4th Armoured Brigade
- 6th Armoured Brigade
- 1st Cavalry Brigade
- 2nd Cavalry Brigade
- 3rd Cavalry Brigade
- 4th Cavalry Brigade
- 6th Cavalry Brigade
- 1st Field Brigade artillery
- 2nd Field Brigade artillery
- 3rd Field Brigade artillery
- 4th Field Brigade artillery
- 5th Field Brigade artillery
- 6th Field Brigade artillery
- 7th Field Brigade artillery
- 8th Field Brigade artillery
- 9th Field Brigade artillery
- 10th Field Brigade artillery
- 11th Field Brigade artillery
- 12th Field Brigade artillery
- 13th Field Brigade artillery
- 14th Field Brigade artillery
- 15th Field Brigade artillery
- 18th Field Brigade artillery
- 21st Field Brigade artillery
- 22nd Field Brigade artillery
- 1st Medium Brigade artillery
- 2nd Medium Brigade artillery
- 1st Heavy Brigade artillery
- 2nd Heavy Brigade artillery
- 3rd Heavy Brigade artillery
- 5th Heavy Brigade artillery
- 6th Heavy Brigade artillery
- 7th Heavy Brigade artillery
- 1st Garrison Brigade
- 2nd Garrison Brigade
- 3rd Garrison Brigade
- 5th Garrison Brigade
- 1st Infantry Brigade
- 2nd Infantry Brigade
- 3rd Infantry Brigade
- 4th Infantry Brigade
- 5th Infantry Brigade
- 6th Infantry Brigade
- 7th Infantry Brigade
- 8th Infantry Brigade
- 9th Infantry Brigade
- 10th Infantry Brigade
- 11th Infantry Brigade
- 12th Infantry Brigade
- 13th Infantry Brigade
- 14th Infantry Brigade
- 15th Infantry Brigade
- 16th Infantry Brigade
- 17th Infantry Brigade
- 18th Infantry Brigade
- 19th Infantry Brigade
- 20th Infantry Brigade
- 21st Infantry Brigade
- 22nd Infantry Brigade
- 23rd Infantry Brigade
- 24th Infantry Brigade
- 25th Infantry Brigade
- 26th Infantry Brigade
- 27th Infantry Brigade
- 28th Infantry Brigade
- 29th Infantry Brigade
- 30th Infantry Brigade
- 31st Infantry Brigade
- 32nd Infantry Brigade
- 33rd Infantry Brigade
- 34th Infantry Brigade
- 1st Motor Brigade
- 2nd Motor Brigade
- 3rd Motor Brigade
- 4th Motor Brigade
- 5th Motor Brigade
- 6th Motor Brigade
- 1st Support Group
- 1st Training Brigade
- 2nd Division Infantry Training Brigade
- 4th Training Brigade
- 6th Training Brigade
- 7th Training Brigade
- 9th Training Brigade

== Canada ==
- 1st Canadian Army Group Royal Artillery
- 2nd Canadian Army Group Royal Artillery
- 1st (Halifax) Coast Brigade, RCA
- 3rd (New Brunswick) Coast Brigade RCA
- 5th (British Columbia) Coast Brigade RCA
- 15th (Vancouver) Coast Brigade RCA
- 16th Coast Brigade RCA
- 1st Field Brigade, RCA
- 2nd Field Brigade, RCA
- 3rd Field Brigade, RCA
- 5th Field Brigade, RCA
- 8th Field Brigade, RCA
- 10th Field Brigade, RCA
- 11th Field Brigade, RCA
- 12th Field Brigade, RCA
- 14th Field Brigade, RCA
- 18th Field Brigade, RCA
- 19th Field Brigade, RCA
- 20th Field Brigade, RCA
- 21st Field Brigade, RCA
- 24thField Brigade, RCA
- 26th Field Brigade, RCA
- 27th Field Brigade, RCA
- 2nd Medium Brigade, RCA
- 4th Medium Brigade, RCA
- 6th Medium Brigade, RCA
- 7th Medium Brigade, RCA
- 1st Canadian Anti-Aircraft Brigade
- 1st Canadian Armoured Brigade
- 2nd Canadian Armoured Brigade
- 3rd Canadian Armoured Brigade
- 4th Canadian Armoured Brigade
- 5th Canadian Armoured Brigade
- 1st Canadian Army Tank Brigade
- 2nd Canadian Army Tank Brigade
- 3rd Canadian Army Tank Brigade
- 1st (Reserve) Cavalry Brigade
- 2nd (Reserve) Cavalry Brigade
- 3rd (Reserve) Cavalry Brigade
- 1st Canadian Infantry Brigade
- 2nd Canadian Infantry Brigade
- 3rd Canadian Infantry Brigade
- 4th Canadian Infantry Brigade
- 5th Canadian Infantry Brigade
- 6th Canadian Infantry Brigade
- 7th Canadian Infantry Brigade
- 8th Canadian Infantry Brigade
- 9th Canadian Infantry Brigade
- 10th Canadian Infantry Brigade
- 11th Canadian Infantry Brigade
- 12th Canadian Infantry Brigade
- 13th Canadian Infantry Brigade
- 14th Canadian Infantry Brigade
- 15th Canadian Infantry Brigade
- 16th Canadian Infantry Brigade
- 17th Canadian Infantry Brigade
- 18th Canadian Infantry Brigade
- 19th Canadian Infantry Brigade
- 20th Canadian Infantry Brigade
- 21st Canadian Infantry Brigade
- 31st Canadian Infantry Brigade (Reserve)
- 32nd Canadian Infantry Brigade (Reserve)
- 33rd Canadian Infantry Brigade (Reserve)
- 34th Canadian Infantry Brigade (Reserve)
- 35th Canadian Infantry Brigade (Reserve)
- 36th Canadian Infantry Brigade (Reserve)
- 37th Canadian Infantry Brigade (Reserve)
- 38th Canadian Infantry Brigade (Reserve)
- 39th Canadian Infantry Brigade (Reserve)
- 40th Canadian Infantry Brigade (Reserve)
- 41st Canadian Infantry Brigade (Reserve)
- 42nd Canadian Infantry Brigade (Reserve)
- 1st Canadian Infantry Regiment
- 2nd Canadian Infantry Regiment
- 3rd Canadian Infantry Regiment
- 1st Canadian Infantry Training Brigade
- 14th Canadian Infantry Training Brigade
- West Brigade
- Island Brigade

RCA = Royal Canadian Artillery

== New Zealand ==
- 1st New Zealand Infantry Brigade
- 2nd New Zealand Infantry Brigade
- 3rd New Zealand Infantry Brigade
- 4th New Zealand Infantry Brigade
- 5th New Zealand Infantry Brigade
- 6th New Zealand Infantry Brigade
- 7th New Zealand Infantry Brigade
- 8th New Zealand Infantry Brigade
- 9th New Zealand Infantry Brigade
- 10th New Zealand Infantry Brigade
- 11th New Zealand Infantry Brigade
- 12th New Zealand Infantry Brigade
- 14th New Zealand Infantry Brigade
- 1st New Zealand Army Tank Brigade
- 4th New Zealand Armoured Brigade

== South Africa ==
- 1st South African Field Brigade, SAA
- 2nd South African Field Brigade, SAA
- 3rd South African Field Brigade, SAA
- 4th South African Field Brigade, SAA
- 5th South African Field Brigade, SAA
- 6th South African Field Brigade, SAA
- 7th South African Field Brigade, SAA
- The Coast Artillery Brigade, SAA
- 1st Anti-Tank Brigade
- 2nd Anti-Tank Brigade
- 1st South African Infantry Brigade
- 2nd South African Infantry Brigade
- 3rd South African Infantry Brigade
- 4th South African Infantry Brigade
- 5th South African Infantry Brigade
- 6th South African Infantry Brigade
- 7th South African Infantry Brigade
- 8th South African Infantry Brigade
- 9th South African Infantry Brigade
- 10th South African Infantry Brigade
- 11th South African Infantry Brigade
- 12th South African Infantry Brigade
- 11th South African Armoured Brigade
- 12th South African Motorised Infantry Brigade
- 13th South African Motorised Infantry Brigade
- 1st South African Mounted Brigade
- 2nd South African Mounted Brigade
- 1st South African Army Tank Brigade
- 1st South African Reserve Brigade

SAA = South African Artillery

== Straits Settlement ==
- Straits Settlements Volunteer Force Brigade

== See also ==
- List of British Commonwealth and Empire divisions in the Second World War
- Military history of the British Commonwealth in the Second World War
