= Geoffrey Street =

Australian politician

Brigadier the Honourable Geoffrey Street
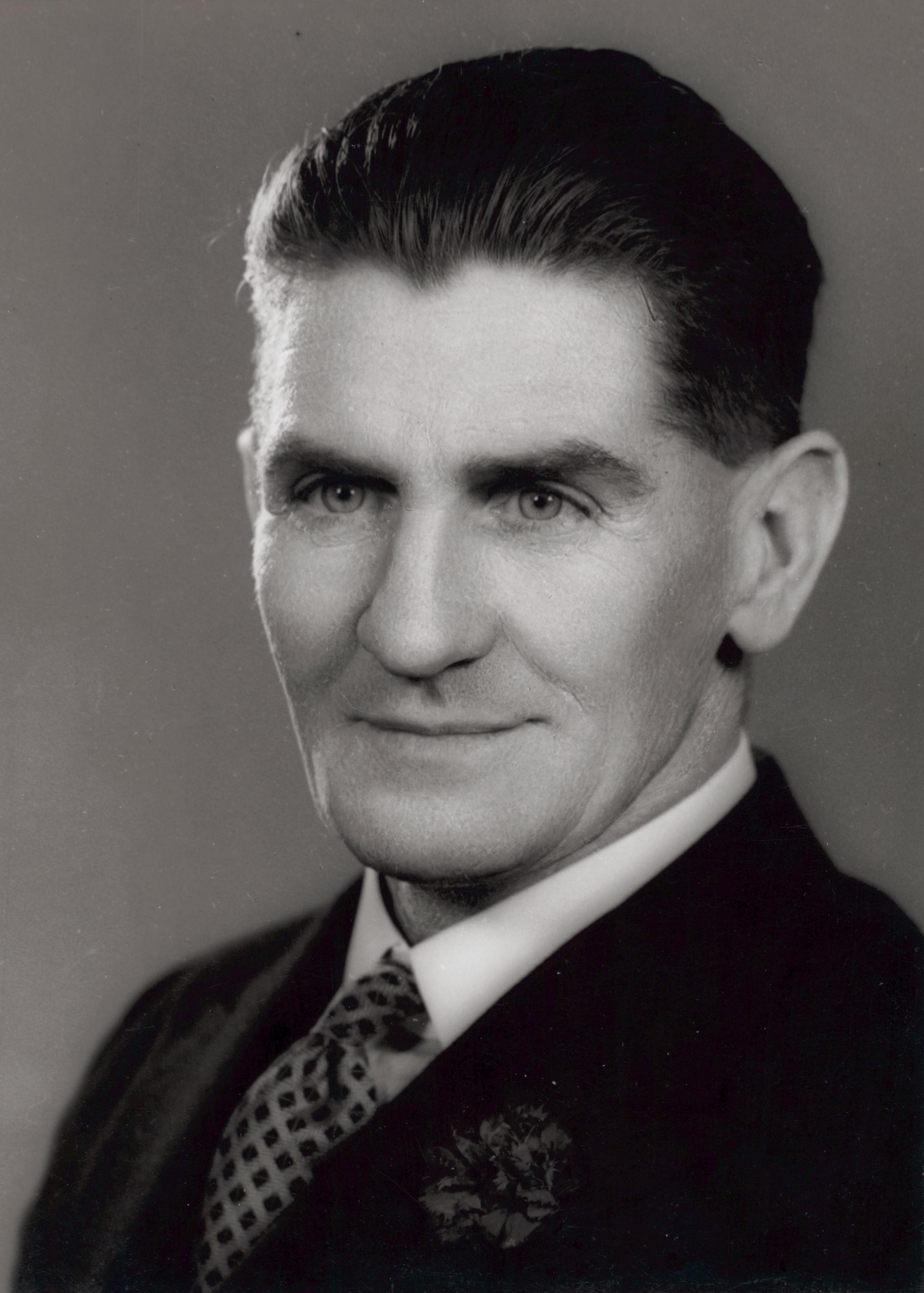

Minister for the Army
- In office 13 November 1939 – 13 August 1940
- Prime Minister: Robert Menzies
- Preceded by: New title
- Succeeded by: Percy Spender

Minister for Repatriation
- In office 14 March 1940 – 13 August 1940
- Prime Minister: Robert Menzies
- Preceded by: Eric Harrison
- Succeeded by: Philip McBride

Minister for Defence
- In office 7 November 1938 – 13 November 1939
- Prime Minister: Joseph Lyons; Earle Page; Robert Menzies
- Preceded by: Harold Thorby
- Succeeded by: Robert Menzies (Defence Co-ordination)

Member of the Australian Parliament for Corangamite
- In office 15 September 1934 – 13 August 1940
- Preceded by: William Gibson
- Succeeded by: Allan McDonald

Personal details
- Born: 21 January 1894 Woollahra, New South Wales, Australia
- Died: 13 August 1940 (aged 46) Canberra, Australian Capital Territory, Australia
- Party: United Australia Party
- Spouse: Evora Francis Currie (m. 1918)
- Relations: Street family
- Children: Tony Street
- Education: University of Sydney
- Profession: Pastoralist

Military service
- Allegiance: Australia
- Branch/service: Australian Imperial Force; Citizen Military Forces
- Years of service: 1914–1919; 1931–1940
- Rank: Brigadier
- Commands: 3rd Cavalry Brigade; 4th Light Horse Regiment
- Battles/wars: First World War; Gallipoli Campaign; Western Front
- Awards: Military Cross

Brigadier Geoffrey Austin Street, MC (21 January 1894 – 13 August 1940) was an Australian politician and an army officer. He was a member of the United Australia Party (UAP), and he served as Minister for Defence (1938–1939), the Army (1939–1940) and Repatriation (1940) in the early years of Australia's involvement in the Second World War. He was killed in the 1940 Canberra air disaster, along with two other federal cabinet ministers and the head of the army.

Street enlisted in the Australian Imperial Force on the outbreak of the First World War. He served in the Gallipoli Campaign and on the Western Front, winning the Military Cross and ending the war with the rank of major. He was later promoted to brigadier in the Citizen Military Forces. Street subsequently farmed near Lismore, Victoria, entering politics with the support of Robert Menzies. He won the Division of Corangamite at the 1934 federal election and was promoted to cabinet in 1938 by Prime Minister Joseph Lyons. Following Lyons' death the following year, Menzies became prime minister and Street oversaw an expansion of the military. His son Anthony Austin Street succeeded him in his seat of Corangamite, and as a federal cabinet minister.

== Early life and education ==
Street was born on 21 January 1894 in Woollahra, Sydney, New South Wales, Australia. He was the second son of Australian lawyer John William Street and Mary Veronica Street (née Austin). His father was a "prosperous city solicitor", and his mother was the niece of poet laureate Alfred Austin. His maternal grandfather Henry Austin was the chairman of the Perpetual Trustee Company, which was founded by his forebear John Street, who was an Australian politician.

Street attended Sydney Grammar School, where he was captain of the school cricket team and also represented the school in rugby union, swimming and athletics. He passed his senior examinations in December 1912 and enrolled in law at the University of Sydney, initially studying towards a Bachelor of Arts degree. He had an "undistinguished academic record" but continued his involvement in sport, both as a player and in administrative capacities.

== First World War ==
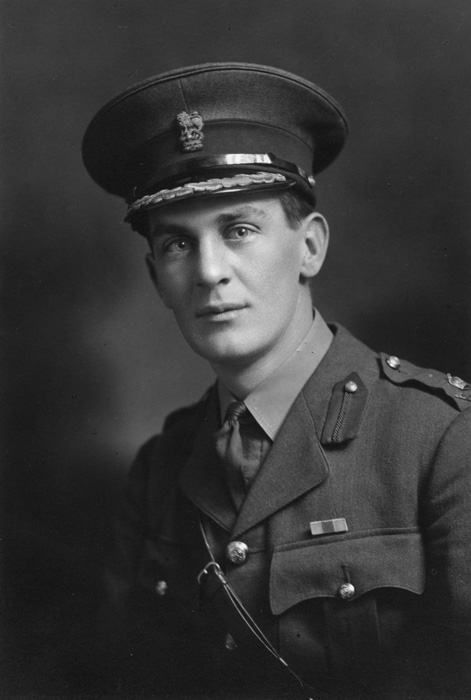
Street in military uniform during the First World War

In August 1914, following the outbreak of the First World War, Street enlisted as a private in the Australian Naval and Military Expeditionary Force. He was due to sail with the expeditionary force to German New Guinea, but instead transferred to the 1st Brigade of the Australian Imperial Force (AIF) in order to go to Europe. He was commissioned as a second lieutenant in the 1st Battalion and left Sydney aboard HMAT Afric on 18 October 1914.

Street arrived in Alexandria, Egypt, in early December. After further training his battalion sailed via Lemnos to participate in the Gallipoli campaign. He participated in the Landing at Anzac Cove on 25 April 1915 as platoon commander of "D" Company. He and his men reinforced a hill named Baby 700 and succeeded in holding the position for several days. Street received a "slight" wound to the head and was evacuated back to Egypt, where he was promoted to full lieutenant with effect from 26 April. He returned a month later and led a mission on 4 June to eliminate an Ottoman machine-gun, which ended in him "unexpectedly stumbling into Turkish troops in a supposedly unoccupied 'sniper’s trench'". His sergeant on the mission Harry Freame became a lifelong friend. Street was subsequently appointed acting adjutant of the 1st Battalion and in November was promoted to captain. He and the 1st Battalion were evacuated to Egypt the following month.

In early 1916, Street went to France with the 1st Battalion. He was soon seconded to the 14th Battalion where served as staff captain during the Battle of Fromelles, in charge of the 4th Brigade's report centre. He was sent to Cambridge, England, for further training in February 1917. He returned to the front in July 1917 as brigade major to Brigadier General Harold "Pompey" Elliott; he was promoted major in October. Their working relationship was poor. While Elliott described Street as "a very decent boy" and "a very lovable lad", he regarded him as constantly needing direction and overinvolved with recreational activities. He also "resented having the charming and well-connected staff officer foisted upon him" in place of one of his own men of a lower social standing. Street was finally transferred away from Elliott's staff in April 1918 following an incident in which a poorly worded order placed three battalions in danger.

In early 1918 Street learned that he had been awarded the Military Cross in the 1918 New Year Honours. After his marriage in June he rejoined the 1st Battalion at Pradelles and was appointed officer commanding of "A" Company. His unit saw action in the Second Battle of the Somme as well as skirmishes at Chuignolles and Hargicourt. Street was shot in the wrist by a machine gun bullet in September 1918, and after a period of sick leave joined the Demobilisation and Repatriation Branch in London. His AIF appointment was terminated on 2 August 1919. Three of his cousins were killed in the war, and his younger brother Anthony died in the 1918 Spanish flu pandemic while on active duty.

== Post-war activities ==
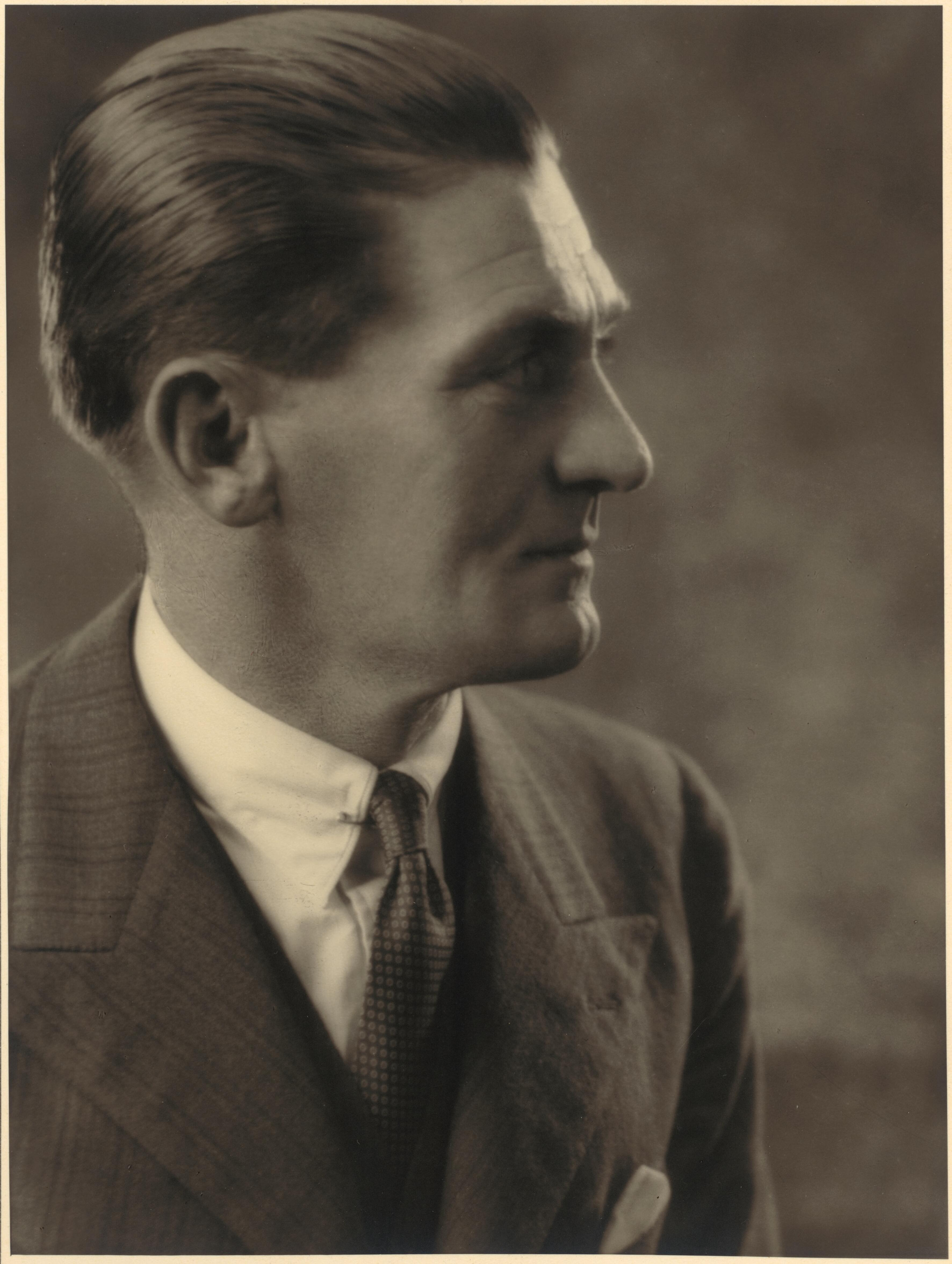
Undated photo, c. 1930s

Street and his wife returned to Australia in 1920 and settled on a property near Lismore in the Western District of Victoria, which had been part of his father-in-law's estate. There he raised and exhibited Polwarth sheep, becoming involved with the Australian Sheep Breeders' Association and the Lismore Agricultural and Pastoral Society. Street was elected to the Hampden Shire Council in 1924 and served as shire president from 1931 to 1932. He was a member of the reserve of officers and in December 1932 was promoted to lieutenant colonel as regimental commander of the 4th Light Horse Regiment. He would later be given command of the 3rd Cavalry Brigade in 1935 and promoted to temporary brigadier. Street was an early member of the Young Nationalists Organisation founded by Robert Menzies. He served as campaign secretary for Thomas Chester Manifold at the 1929 Victorian state election. In 1933, his public profile was raised when Menzies, the Victorian railways minister, appointed him to the Victorian Transport Regulation Board. He was the principal author of its report into transport regulation.

== Federal politics ==
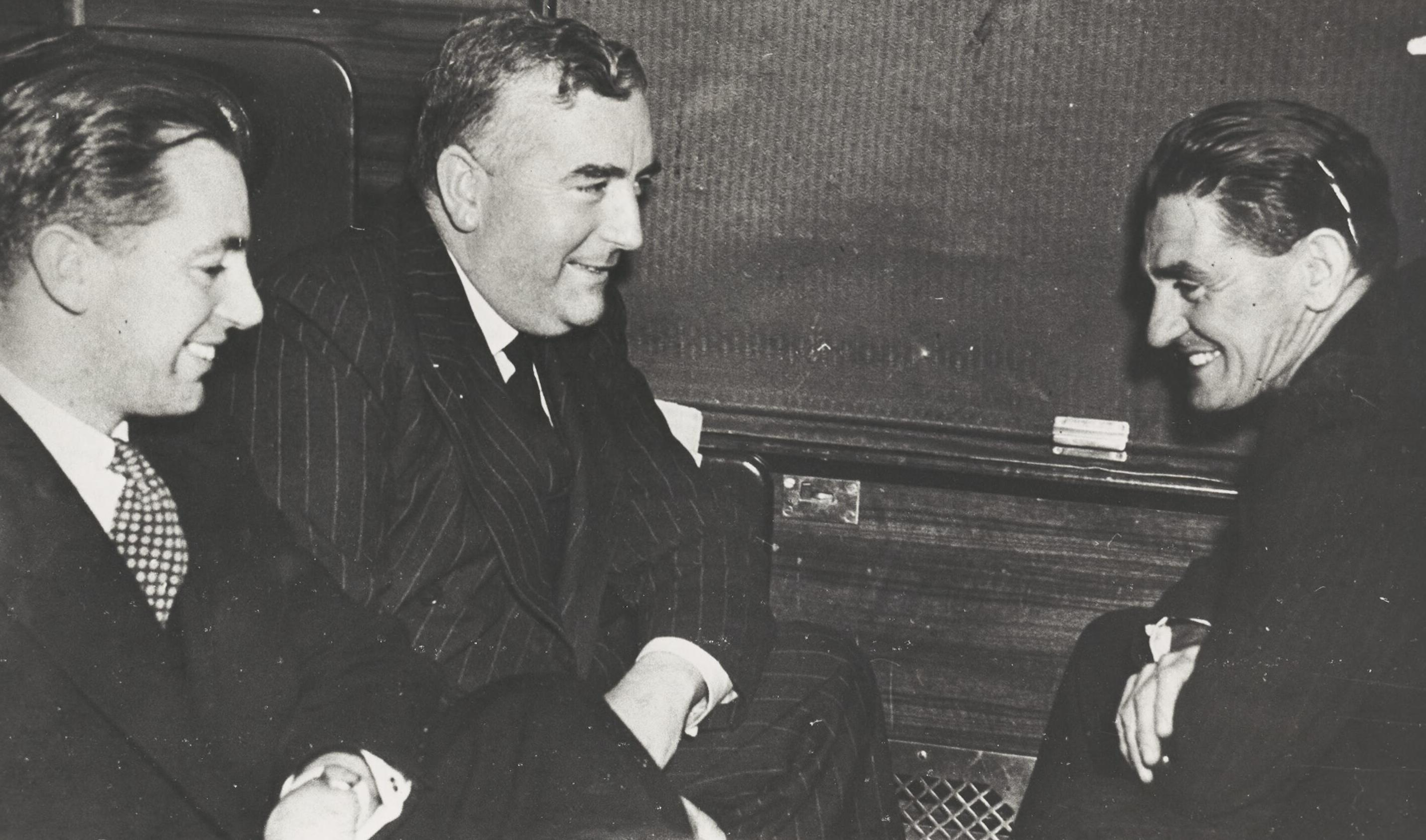
Street (right) in 1939 with Harold Holt (left) and Robert Menzies

Street was elected to the House of Representatives at the 1934 federal election, standing for the United Australia Party (UAP) in the seat of Corangamite. The seat had previously been held by the Country Party. He was re-elected at the 1937 election, which followed a favourable redistribution.

Street's early parliamentary speeches focused on rural policy matters, including better telephone services and more frequent mail deliveries. He also spoke in support of Elizabeth Kenny's then-controversial polio treatments. Street took an increasing interest in defence policy, querying why the statutory Council of Defence had not been convened for five years and contributing to UAP defence minister Archdale Parkhill's decision to reconstruct the council. During the 1936–37 budget debate he supported an increase in military expenditure and the expansion of the Royal Military College, Duntroon.

=== Cabinet minister, 1938–1940 ===
Street (right) with Richard Casey (left) and Robert Menzies in 1939

In July 1938, Street was appointed as parliamentary secretary to defence minister Harold Thorby. He was elevated to cabinet by Prime Minister Joseph Lyons on 7 November 1938 and succeeded Thorby as minister for defence. The reshuffle followed the Munich crisis and an intense debate within the Lyons government on defence policy.

Shortly after his appointment, Street put forward a successful cabinet proposal for an expansion of the defence budget, securing an increase from ₤43 million to ₤62.5 million. He worked closely with Ernest Squires, a British officer who had been appointed inspector general of the Australian Military Forces earlier in 1938. He enacted many of Squires' recommendations on army reorganisation, including increased staff appointments for Militia officers, the dismissal of senior staff corps officers regarded as redundant, the relaxation of recruiting criteria and the creation of a permanent mobile force. At a joint meeting of chiefs of staff in January 1939 he commissioned an urgent review of military preparedness.

In April 1939, Lyons died and was succeeded as UAP leader and prime minister by Menzies. He was seen as a close ally of Menzies and was given fourth rank in cabinet. The following month he secured the appointment of Squires to succeed John Lavarack as chief of the general staff, initially on an acting basis. He also commissioned a national registry of manpower and census of wealth.

From November 1939, Menzies abolished the position of Minister for Defence and appointed Street Minister for the Army and Minister for Repatriation. Street died in the 1940 Canberra air disaster along with two other cabinet ministers. His son, Tony Street, was Member for Corangamite from 1966 to 1984, and a senior minister in Malcolm Fraser's government.

== Personal life ==
Street married Evora Frances "Gyp" Currie on 29 June 1918 at St Columba's Church, London. He first met his future wife when he played cricket against her brother in 1912. She had arrived in England in 1916 as a volunteer and served with a Voluntary Aid Detachment.

Street had a lifelong love of cricket and had a collection of nearly 600 books on the sport. During the war he and Test cricketer Charlie Kelleway organised games on makeshift pitches. His post-war career was hampered by his wounded wrist but he played six years of first-grade cricket for the Melbourne Cricket Club, bowling leg spin. Other Test cricketers he played alongside included Warwick Armstrong, Bill Ponsford, Bill Woodfull and Jack Ryder, sometimes in charity matches.

Political offices
Preceded by Harold Thorby	Minister for Defence; 1938–1939	Succeeded by Robert Menzies
New title	Minister for the Army; 1939–1940	Succeeded by Philip McBride
Preceded by Eric Harrison	Minister for Repatriation; 1940	Succeeded by George McLeay
Parliament of Australia
Preceded by William Gibson	Member for Corangamite; 1934–1940	Succeeded by Allan McDonald
