= Naval Base Merauke =

Major World War 2 base in New Guinea

- Location in Western New Guinea and Indonesia Naval Base Merauke (Indonesia)
- Coordinates: 8°28′S 140°20′E
- Province: South Papua
- Naval Base: United States Navy
- Dates: 1943-1945
- Time zone: UTC+9 (Indonesia Eastern Time)
- Climate: Aw

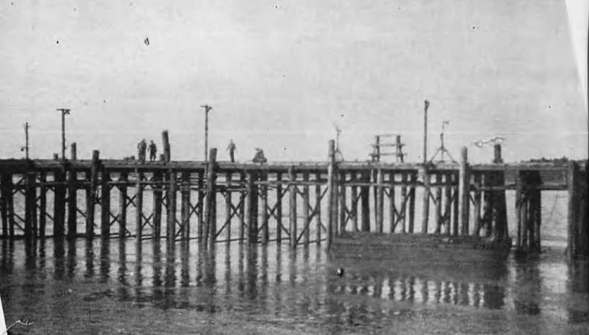
Naval Base Merauke dock in 1944

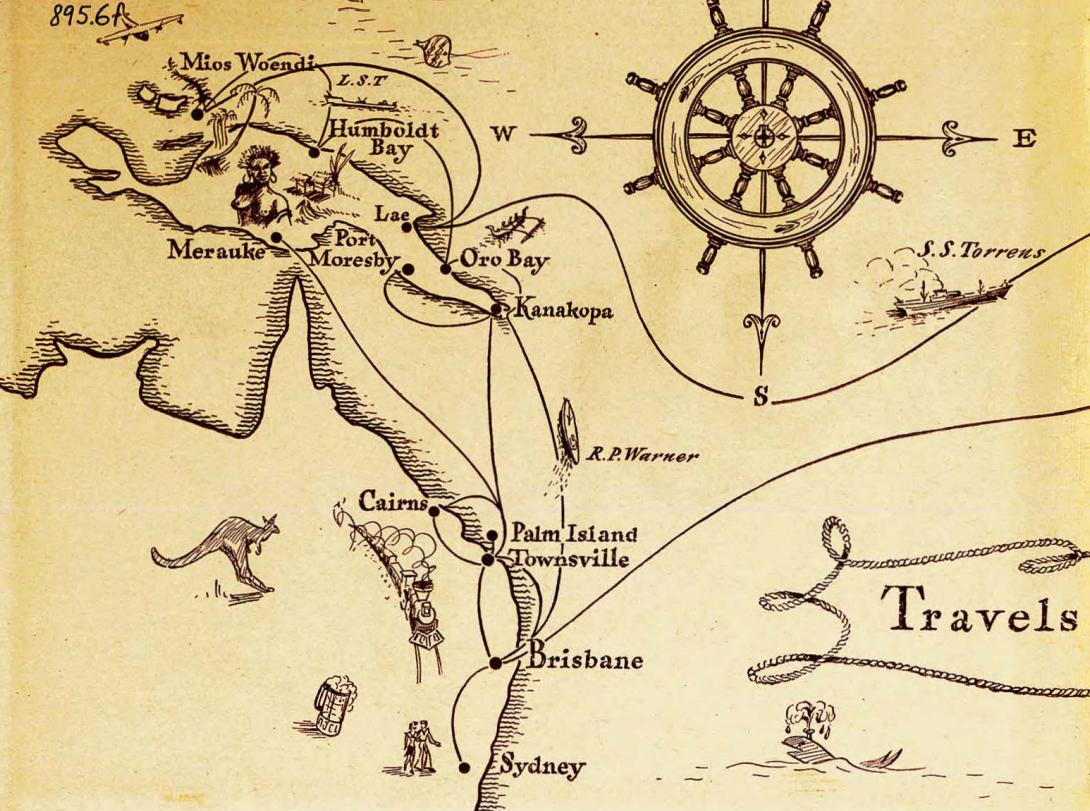
Camp Seabee Naval Base Brisbane, base building trips

Naval Base Merauke was a United States Navy base built during World War II at city of Merauke in the South Papua province of Indonesia, then Dutch New Guinea. The base was 2 miles from the mouth of the Merauke River. The US Navy built a PT boat base and base dock with anchorage to support the Pacific War and the New Guinea campaign.

== History ==
Merauke is a tropical city on the south coast of New Guinea Island. Base construction started on May 8, 1943 with the arrival of Seabees of the 55th Battalion. Much of the port had been destroyed by Japanese bombs. Seabee removed debris and repaired that which was usable. With the port dock destroyed, cows and barges were used to bring supply to shore, while a temporary wharf was built. A Seabee camp was built and a water purification plant. A permanent 300-foot pier and a PT boat base were completed on September 3.

On June 28 a 6,000-foot runway construction was started and was completed on July 7, 1943. The Empire of Japan had bases on the north shore of New Guinea, so the base was attacked by air sometimes with strafing and bombing. The first attack was on May 11, with no injuries, and some loss of gear. Naval Base Merauke operated daily reconnaissance patrols and the US Army did bombing missions from the runway. Merauke Force operated out of the base also.

== Bases and facilities ==
- Anchorage
- PT boat Bases
- Tank farm
- Naval Port facilities
- Supply depot
- Fuel depot
- Ammunition depot on Frances Bay
- Seabees camp
- Merauke Airfield 6,000-foot runway, that is now Mopah International Airport

== Gallery ==
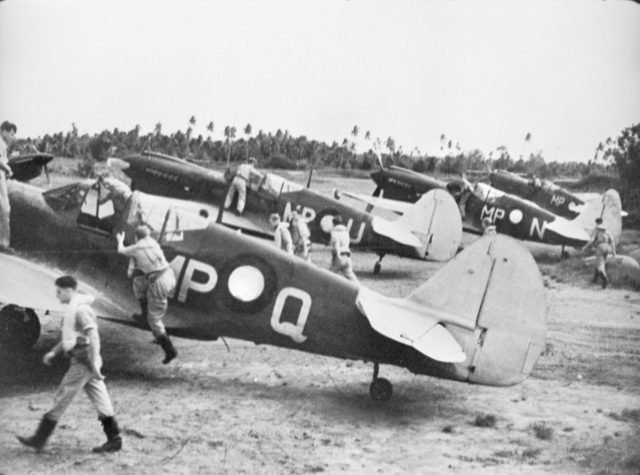
No. 86 Squadron RAAF about to take off in their Kittyhawk fighters at Merauke in April 1944

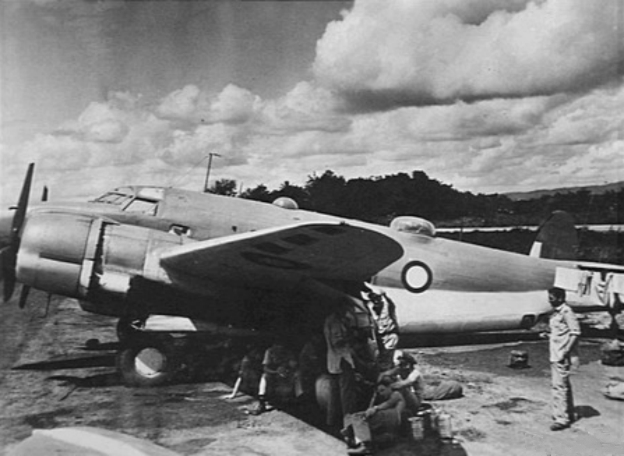
Lockheed Ventura with RAAF at Merauke 1944

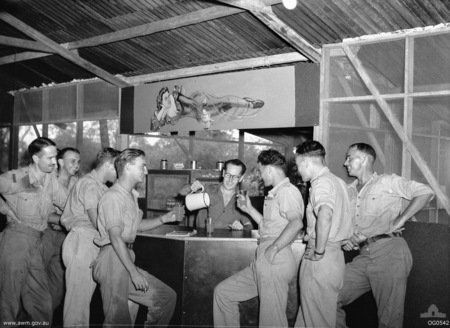
RAAF No. 12 Squadron pilots in the mess at Merauke in December 1943

== See also ==
- US Naval Advance Bases
- Naval Base Darwin
- Naval Base Milne Bay
- No. 84 Squadron RAAF
- New Guinea campaign
- US Naval Base New Guinea
