= 2/4th Pioneer Battalion =

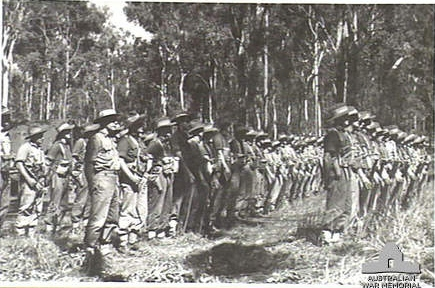
- Troops from the 2/4th parade at Wongabel, Queensland, in May 1944
- Active: 1941–1946
- Country: Australia
- Branch: Australian Army
- Role: Pioneer
- Size: Battalion
- Part of: 23rd Brigade; 3rd Brigade; 1st Beach Group
- Colours: Purple, white and grey
- Engagements: World War II: Borneo campaign

Insignia
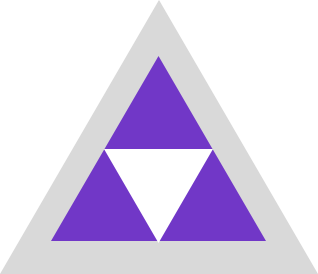
- Unit colour patch

The 2/4th Pioneer Battalion was a unit of the Australian Army raised for service during the Second World War. A pioneer unit, the battalion undertook both infantry and engineer tasks. Despite being raised early in the war, the battalion did not see action until the final months, taking part in the Borneo campaign where, as part of the 1st Beach Group, it fought against the Japanese in support of the 9th Division. It was disbanded in early 1946 following the end of hostilities.

== History ==
Formed in February 1941 at Greta, New South Wales, the 2/4th Pioneer Battalion was one of four pioneer battalions raised to provide engineer support to the 2nd Australian Imperial Force's four infantry divisions. Trained as infantry, the battalion undertook both the infantry and engineer support roles and was organised along conventional infantry lines with a headquarters and four companies, but was made up of personnel with trade or practical skills, and within the divisional structure, the pioneers were administered as corps troops under the direction of the divisional engineer commander.

Allocated to the 23rd Brigade of the 8th Division, after initial training it was sent north to Darwin in September to construct defences around the Adelaide River and Noonamah amidst concerns about Japanese intentions in the Pacific. While most of the division deployed to Malaya, the 2/4th remained behind and following the Japanese entry into the war, the battalion was allocated to bolster the garrison at Koepang as part of Sparrow Force on Timor. An advanced party was sent to the island in early February 1942, and on 14 February the rest of the battalion followed; however, the convoy in which they were embarked was attacked by Japanese aircraft and it was turned back. Returning to Darwin, the majority of the 2/4th's equipment was lost when the ship carrying it was sunk in Darwin harbour during a Japanese air attack on 19 February. Consequently, the battalion's deployment was cancelled and it remained in the north for more than a year, during which time they undertook defensive duties to counter the threat of Japanese invasion. During this time, the battalion was commanded by Lieutenant Colonel John McCarty. In November 1942, the battalion was reassigned to the 3rd Brigade, a Militia formation that had been mobilised for full-time service and sent to the Northern Territory earlier in the year to bolster the field force there.

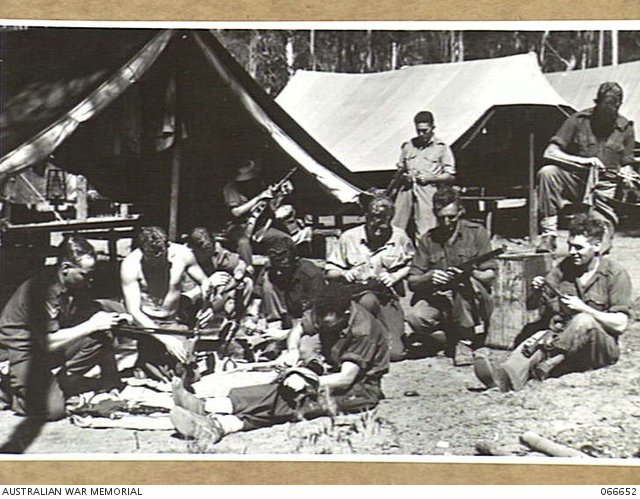
Troops of the 2/4th Pioneer Battalion at Wongabel, 1944

In March 1943, the strategic situation had improved and the pioneers were relieved of garrison duties, moving to the Atherton Tablelands where the 2nd AIF divisions were converted to the jungle division establishment as the Army prepared to go on the offensive in New Guinea. The battalion remained there throughout 1943 and the following year it was assigned to the 1st Beach Group, which had been raised to provide support to amphibious operations. In mid-1945, the battalion finally went into action. In June that year, as part of one of the final Australian operations of the war, the battalion landed on Labuan as part of the Operation Oboe landings in Borneo, assigned to support the 9th Division. Serving in the terminal support role around the beachhead, the 2/4th saw limited combat and its casualties during the fighting on Borneo were light with only five men being killed in battle. The majority of these were suffered during a raid on the Australian beachhead by 50 Japanese soldiers on 21 June.

Following the conclusion of hostilities in August 1945, the battalion remained in the Kuching area where it undertook garrison duties maintaining law and order and processing Japanese prisoners of war for return to Japan, before returning to Australia in December. As the demobilisation process began, the battalion's personnel were transferred for further service or discharged and it was eventually disbanded in early 1946.

For its service during the war, the 2/4th received two battle honours: South-West Pacific 1945 and Borneo. Nineteen men were killed in action or died on active service while serving with the battalion and three were wounded; two members of the battalion were decorated with a Mention in Despatches. After the war, the pioneer role was assumed as a specialisation within the conventional infantry establishment within the Australian Army, and consequently the wartime pioneer battalions have not been re-raised.
