= John Forsyth (general) =

Australian general (1867–1928)

John Keatly Forsyth
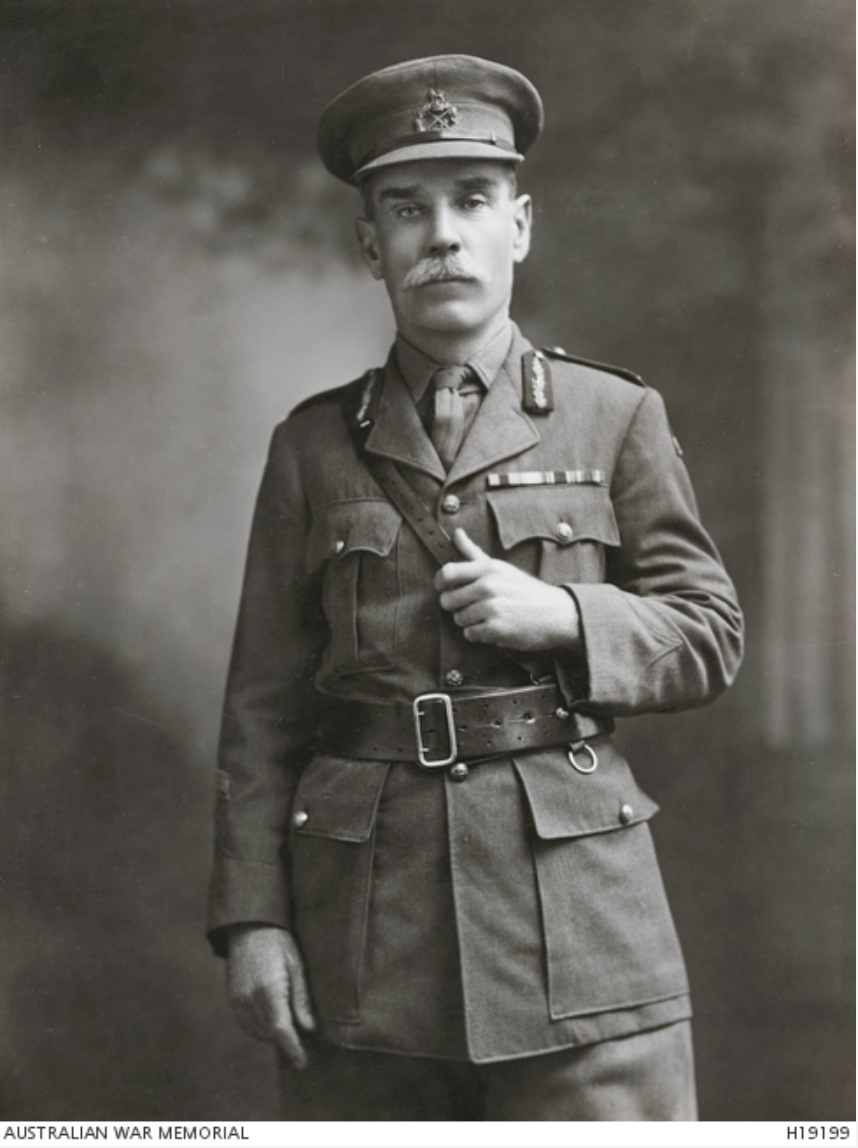
- Born: John Keatly Forsyth; 8 February 1867; Brisbane, Queensland
- Died: 12 November 1928 (aged 61); Sea Lake, Victoria
- Burial place: Boroondara General Cemetery
- Military career
- Allegiance: Australia
- Branch: Australian Army
- Service years: 1885–1925
- Rank: Major General
- Nickname: "Dad"
- Commands: 4th Military District (1917–18); 2nd Brigade (1915–16); 4th Light Horse Regiment (1914–15)
- Conflicts: First World War; Gallipoli Campaign; Landing at Anzac Cove; Battle of Lone Pine; Western Front; Second Battle of the Somme; Battle of Pozières
- Awards: Companion of the Order of St Michael and St George; Mentioned in Despatches
- Other work: Nationalist Party candidate for the Senate

Major General John Keatly Forsyth, CMG (8 February 1867 – 12 November 1928) was a senior Australian Army officer in the First World War and after.

== Early life and career ==
John Keatly Forsyth was born in Brisbane, colonial Queensland, on 8 February 1867, the son of a builder. He was educated at Fortitude Valley State and the Normal School, Brisbane and became a clerk in a sawmill and later in a solicitor's office.

Forsyth enlisted in the Queensland Mounted Rifles Regiment as a trooper in November 1885. He served as a non commissioned officer before being commissioned a second lieutenant in the Queensland Mounted Infantry on 18 July 1892. He was promoted to lieutenant on 4 November 1892 and captain on 22 September 1896. He joined the Queensland Permanent Forces at a staff lieutenant on 1 August 1897, and was promoted to captain on 1 February 1901. Forsyth served as adjutant of the 4th Queensland Mounted Infantry from 1 March 1901 to 27 February 1902, of the 2nd Queensland Mounted Infantry and 4th Infantry Regiment from 28 February 1902 to 30 June 1902, and of the 2nd Queensland Mounted Infantry again from 1 July 1902 to 12 November 1905.

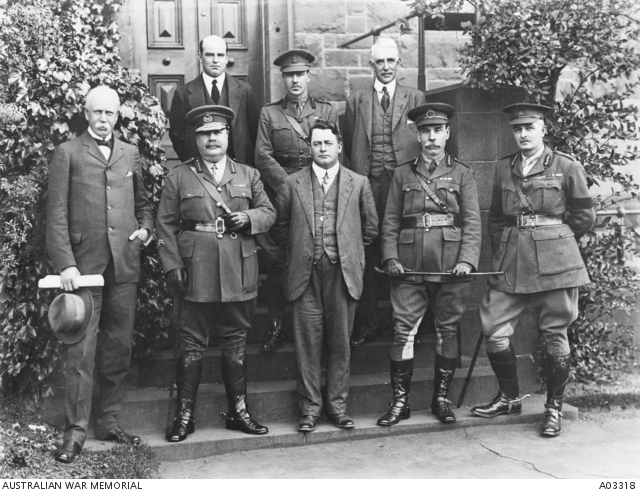
Members of the Australian Army's Military Board, 1914. Legge stands second from the right, next to Colonel James Gordon Legge.

Forsyth moved to Melbourne, where he served as a staff officer. He became secretary to the inspector general, Major General Finn, from 13 November 1905 to 1 October 1906. He joined the Victorian Instructional Staff on 1 February 1907 and was promoted to major on 28 May 1908. In 1909–1910 he was posted to India on exchange duty with the British Indian Army as brigade major of the Amballa Cavalry Brigade. Returning to Melbourne, he was deputy assistant adjutant general (DAAG) for instruction from 1 to 31 December 1910. Forsyth was a GSO2 at Army Headquarters from 1 November 1911 to 30 June 1912, became director of equipment on 1 July 1907, and was promoted to lieutenant colonel on 1 March 1914. On 1 August 1914, he became quartermaster general and a member of the Military Board.

== First World War ==
On 15 August 1914 Forsyth joined the Australian Imperial Force as a temporary colonel. Appointed to command the 1st Division's mounted regiment, the 4th Light Horse Regiment, he also took on responsibility for raising the 1st Light Horse Brigade, whose commander designate, Colonel Harry Chauvel, was still on duty in the United Kingdom. Forsyth embarked with the brigade on 21 October 1914 and handed over command to Chauvel on the latter's arrival in Egypt in November 1914. Forsyth then concentrated on training his own regiment, who referred to him as "Dad".

In May 1915, the light horse were ordered to Gallipoli dismounted to reinforce the infantry. Forsyth arrived at Anzac Cove on 5 May 1915. On 19 May 1915, he became the assistant adjutant and quartermaster general (AA & QMG) of the 1st Division. From 30 May to 8 June he was acting commander of the 2nd Brigade in the absence of Colonel James Whiteside McCay, who had been wounded at Krithia, along with most of the brigade's officers. When McCay was evacuated with a broken leg, Forsyth became commander of the 2nd Brigade on 26 July 1915 and was promoted to colonel and temporary brigadier general. He remained at Anzac with his brigade, fighting another battle at the German Officers' Trench in August, until it was evacuated to Mudros on 10 December 1915.

The 2nd Brigade returned to Egypt in January 1916, and moved to Serapeum, where it guarded the Suez Canal. On 27 March 1916, it sailed for France. The brigade spent a time in the relatively quiet Armentières sector before it was committed on the Somme at Pozières in July. There it was subjected to intense artillery bombardments. Forsyth suffered a breakdown in his health and was evacuated to England. When he was discharged from the hospital, he became commander of 'B' Training Group at Rollestone, England. Ill health forced his return to Australia in December 1916. For his services on the Western Front he was mentioned in despatches and was appointed a Companion of the Order of St Michael and St George (CMG) on 1 January 1917.

== Post war ==
Forsyth became Commandant of the 4th Military District (South Australia) on 16 February 1917 and was promoted to brevet colonel on 24 September 1917. On 2 July 1918, he once again became Quartermaster General and a member of the Military Board. He was promoted to temporary major general in January 1921 but had to relinquish the rank when he was placed on the unattached list in 1922. He retired with the honorary rank of major general on 9 February 1925.

In 1928, Forsyth was selected as a Nationalist Party candidate for the Senate. While campaigning in Sea Lake, Victoria, he came down with influenza and died nine days later on 12 November 1928. He was buried at Boroondara Cemetery, Kew, with full military honours.
