= List of Australian Army brigades =

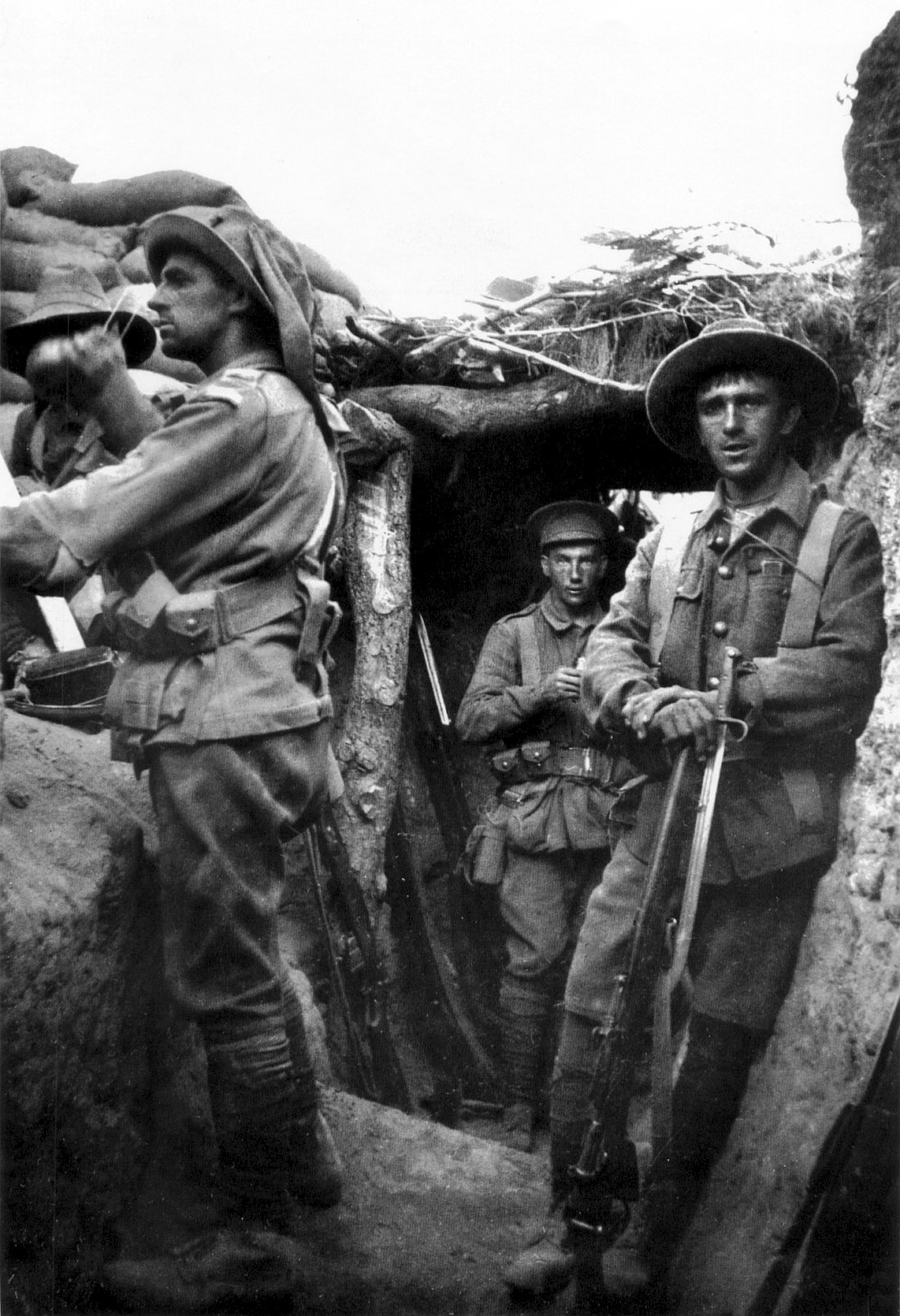
Australian troops from the 1st Brigade in a captured Ottoman trench at Lone Pine, 6 August 1915

This is a list of the brigades raised by the Australian Army. The list includes brigades that served in World War I, World War II, Vietnam and the present-day brigades.

== Current active brigades ==
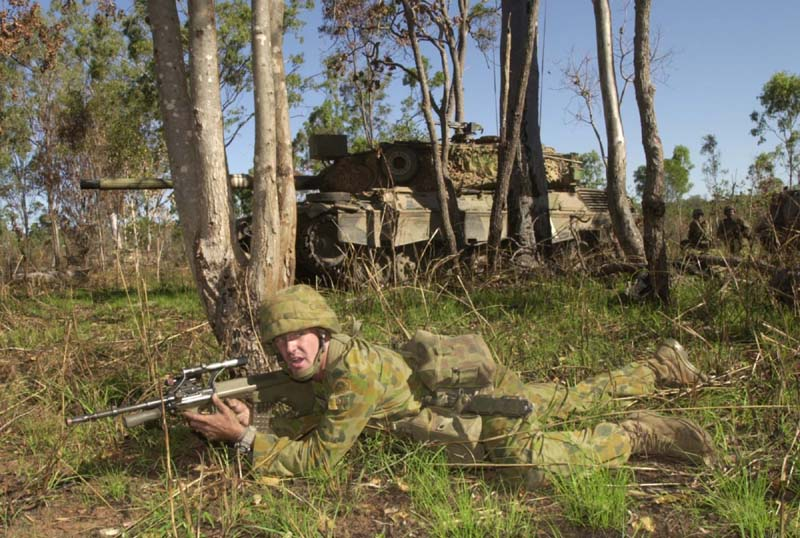
A soldier of the 5/7th Battalion, The Royal Australian Regiment, previously part of the 1st Brigade, conducts fire and movement during training in 2001.

- 1st Brigade
- 3rd Brigade
- 4th Brigade
- 5th Brigade
- 7th Brigade
- 8th Brigade
- 9th Brigade
- 10th Brigade
- 11th Brigade
- 13th Brigade
- 16th Aviation Brigade
- 17th Sustainment Brigade

== World War I ==
=== Light horse ===
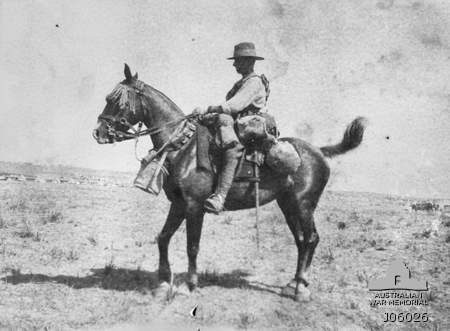
A trooper of the 15th Light Horse Regiment, part of the 5th Light Horse Brigade

- 1st Light Horse Brigade
- 2nd Light Horse Brigade
- 3rd Light Horse Brigade
- 4th Light Horse Brigade
- 5th Light Horse Brigade

=== Infantry ===
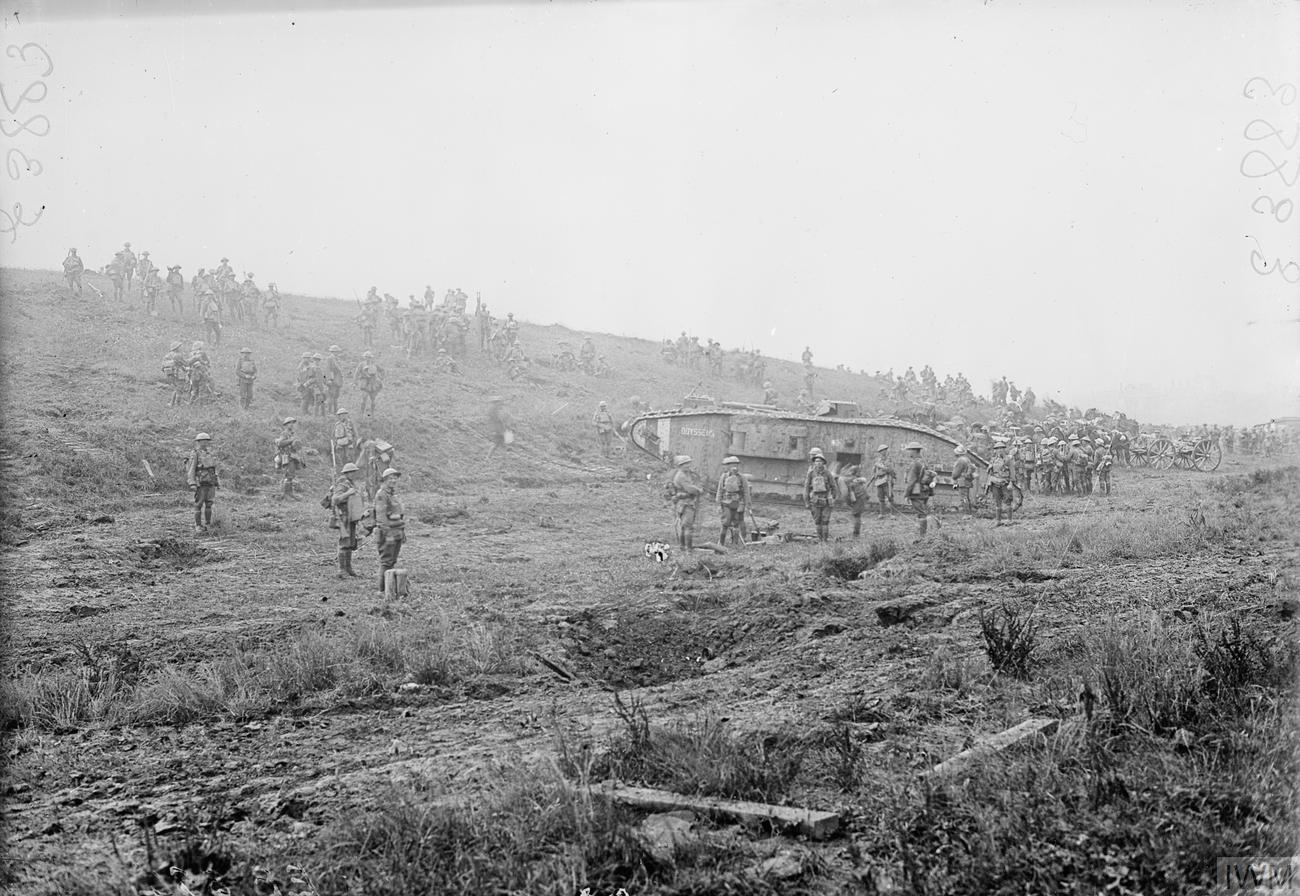
Troops of the 5th Brigade at Picardie, France, 8 August 1918

- 1st Infantry Brigade
- 2nd Infantry Brigade
- 3rd Infantry Brigade
- 4th Infantry Brigade
- 5th Infantry Brigade
- 6th Infantry Brigade
- 7th Infantry Brigade
- 8th Infantry Brigade
- 9th Infantry Brigade
- 10th Infantry Brigade
- 11th Infantry Brigade
- 12th Infantry Brigade
- 13th Infantry Brigade
- 14th Infantry Brigade
- 15th Infantry Brigade
- 16th Infantry Brigade
- 17th Infantry Brigade

== World War II ==
=== Armoured ===
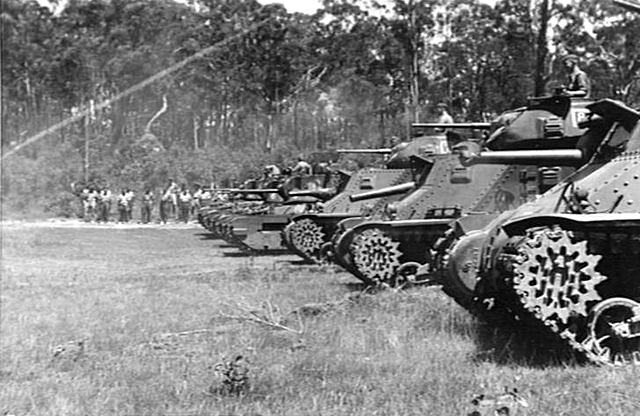
4th Armoured Brigade Matilda II and M3 Grant tanks firing small calibre weapons during a demonstration

- 1st Armoured Brigade
- 2nd Armoured Brigade
- 3rd Army Tank Brigade
- 4th Armoured Brigade
- 6th Armoured Brigade

=== Cavalry ===
- 1st Cavalry Brigade
- 2nd Cavalry Brigade
- 3rd Cavalry Brigade
- 4th Cavalry Brigade
- 6th Cavalry Brigade

=== Support Group ===
- 1st Support Group

=== Motor ===
- 1st Motor Brigade
- 2nd Motor Brigade
- 3rd Motor Brigade
- 4th Motor Brigade
- 5th Motor Brigade
- 6th Motor Brigade

=== Infantry ===
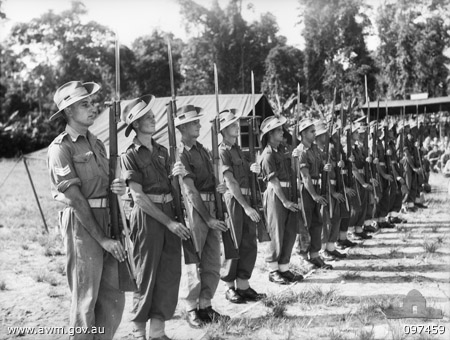
An honour guard drawn from the 7th Brigade and 3rd Division in 1945

- 1st Infantry Brigade
- 2nd Infantry Brigade
- 3rd Infantry Brigade
- 4th Infantry Brigade
- 5th Infantry Brigade
- 6th Infantry Brigade
- 7th Infantry Brigade
- 8th Infantry Brigade
- 9th Infantry Brigade
- 10th Infantry Brigade
- 11th Infantry Brigade
- 12th Infantry Brigade
- 13th Infantry Brigade
- 14th Infantry Brigade
- 15th Infantry Brigade
- 16th Infantry Brigade
- 17th Infantry Brigade
- 18th Infantry Brigade
- 19th Infantry Brigade
- 20th Infantry Brigade
- 21st Infantry Brigade
- 22nd Infantry Brigade
- 23rd Infantry Brigade
- 24th Infantry Brigade
- 25th Infantry Brigade
- 26th Infantry Brigade
- 27th Infantry Brigade
- 28th Infantry Brigade
- 29th Infantry Brigade
- 30th Infantry Brigade
- 31st Infantry Brigade
- 32nd Infantry Brigade
- 33rd Infantry Brigade

=== Garrison ===
- 1st Garrison Brigade
- 2nd Garrison Brigade
- 3rd Garrison Brigade
- 5th Garrison Brigade

=== Training ===
- 1st Training Brigade
- 2nd Division Infantry Training Brigade
- 4th Training Brigade
- 6th Training Brigade
- 7th Training Brigade
- 9th Training Brigade

== Artillery ==
The following artillery formations were all called brigades by the army but with three batteries assigned they were only the size of an artillery regiment.

=== Anti Aircraft Artillery ===
- 1st Anti-Aircraft Brigade

=== Field artillery ===
- 1st Field Brigade
- 2nd Field Brigade
- 3rd Field Brigade
- 4th Field Brigade
- 5th Field Brigade
- 6th Field Brigade
- 7th Field Brigade
- 8th Field Brigade
- 9th Field Brigade
- 10th Field Brigade
- 11th Field Brigade
- 12th Field Brigade
- 13th Field Brigade
- 14th Field Brigade
- 15th Field Brigade
- 18th Field Brigade
- 21st Field Brigade
- 22nd Field Brigade

=== Medium Artillery ===
- 1st Medium Brigade
- 2nd Medium Brigade

=== Heavy Artillery ===
- 1st Heavy Brigade
- 2nd Heavy Brigade
- 3rd Heavy Brigade
- 5th Heavy Brigade
- 6th Heavy Brigade
- 7th Heavy Brigade

== Occupation of Japan ==
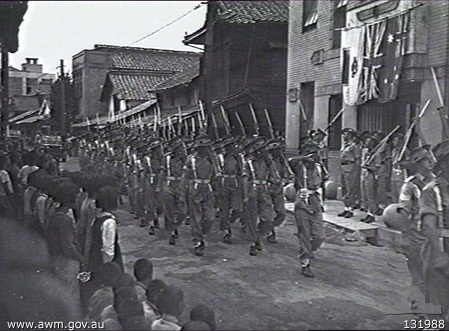
Troops from the 34th Brigade march through Saijo, Japan, in 1946

- 34th Brigade (part of the BCOF and later renamed to 1st Brigade)

== Vietnam ==
- 1st Australian Task Force
