= 1st Support Group (Australia) =

- Active: 1942
- Country: Australia
- Branch: Australian Army
- Type: Armoured Support
- Size: Brigade

Commanders
- Notable commanders: Brigadier Frank Wells

The 1st Support Group was a formation of the Australian Army during World War II. The brigade was formed in February 1942, at Victoria Barracks, Sydney and assigned to the 1st Armoured Division. Support Groups were brigade sized formations assigned to armoured divisions that commanded the infantry and artillery elements. The Support Group did not see any active service and was disbanded at Narrabri, New South Wales in November 1942.

== Brigade units ==
All units that served with the brigade during the war.

- 17th Motor Regiment
- 108th Anti Tank Regiment, Royal Australian Artillery
- 16th Field Regiment, Royal Australian Artillery

== See also ==
- List of Australian Army brigades
