= 4th Light Horse Regiment (Australia) =

- 4th Light Horse Regiment hat badge
- Active: 1914–1919; 1921–1944
- Country: Australia
- Branch: Australian Army
- Type: Mounted infantry
- Size: Regiment
- Part of: 1st Division; 4th Light Horse Brigade
- Engagements: First World War: North African Campaign; Gallipoli campaign; Western Front; Sinai and Palestine Campaign
- Battle honours: France and Flanders 1916–1918; Messines 1917; Ypres 1917; Broodseinde; Passchendaele; Lys; Kemmel; Marne 1918; Tardenois; Gallipoli 1915–1916; ANZAC; Defence at ANZAC; Suvla; Sari Bair; Egypt 1915–1917; Palestine 1917–1918; Beersheba; El Mughar; Nebi Samwill; Jerusalem; Jordan (Es Salt); Megiddo

Insignia
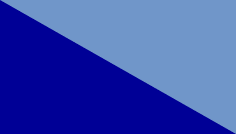
- Unit colour patch

The 4th Light Horse Regiment was a mounted infantry regiment of the Australian Army during the First World War. The regiment was raised in August 1914, as the divisional cavalry regiment for the 1st Division. The regiment fought against the forces of the German Empire and the Ottoman Empire, in Egypt, at Gallipoli, on the Western front, on the Sinai Peninsula, and in Palestine and Jordan. After the armistice the regiment eventually returned to Australia in March 1919. For its role in the war the regiment was awarded twenty-one battle honours.

During the inter-war years, the regiment was re-raised as a part-time unit based in the Corangamite region of southern Victoria. It was later converted to a motor regiment during the Second World War but was disbanded in late 1944 without having been deployed overseas. In the post war period, the regiment was re-raised as an amalgamated unit, designated the 4th/19th Prince of Wales's Light Horse, which is currently part of the Australian Army Reserve.

== Formation ==
On 11 August 1914, the 4th Light Horse Regiment was raised in Melbourne, as the divisional cavalry regiment of the 1st Division. Light horse regiments normally comprised twenty-five officers and 497 other ranks serving in three squadrons, each of six troops. Each troop was divided into eight sections, of four men each. In action one man of each section was nominated as a horse holder reducing the regiment's rifle strength by a quarter. The 4th Light Horse eventually raised five squadrons and later in the war, two of these squadrons were detached to accompany the Australian infantry divisions to France, while the other three remained to the Middle East, serving with the Australian and New Zealand Mounted Division.

All Australian Light Horse regiments used cavalry unit designations, but were mounted infantry, and mounted exclusively on the Australian Waler horse.

== Operational history ==
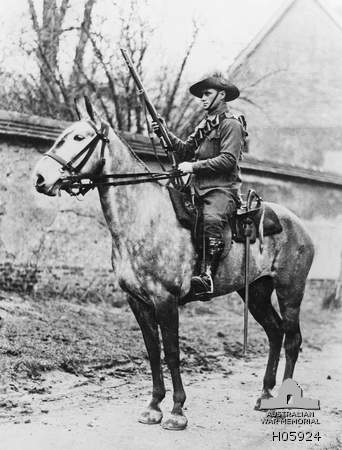
Trooper A. G. Forsyth of the 4th Light Horse Regiment. Forsyth later transferred to the 2nd Anzac Mounted Regiment after Gallipoli and died of pneumonia on 2 April 1917 in England.

=== Gallipoli ===
The regiment sailed for war on 19 October 1914 and arrived in Egypt on 10 December. When the rest of the division departed to take part in the Gallipoli, the light horse were left behind the authorities under the belief that mounted troops would not be needed in the campaign due to the terrain. However, infantry casualties were so severe it was decided to send them, without their horses, as infantry reinforcements. The regiment landed at what became known as ANZAC Cove between the 22 and 24 May 1915. Initially, the regiment was broken up and provided squadrons as reinforcements for infantry battalions at various points around the beachhead, and it was not until 11 June that the regiment concentrated as a formed unit. After this, they were mostly used to defend the Allies' precarious position on the peninsula, especially in the area of "Ryrie's Post", although they did take part in several small assaults. The regiment left Gallipoli prior to the end of the campaign on 11 December 1915.

=== Western Front ===
On their return to Egypt the regiment was required to raise a fourth squadron, known as 'D' Squadron. Together with 'B' Squadron, 'D' Squadron was detached from the regiment and assigned as the divisional cavalry formations, for the 1st and 3rd Divisions, and in mid-1916 they were sent to France, for service on the Western Front.

These two squadrons later took part in the Battle of Messines, the Third Battle of Ypres, the Battle of Broodseinde, the Battle of Passchendaele, the Battle of the Lys, the Battle of Kemmel, the Second Battle of the Marne and the Battle of Tardenois. The two squadrons together with a squadron from New Zealand were eventually amalgamated and renamed the I Anzac Corps Mounted Regiment. (Note: The I ANZAC Mounted Regiment was formed in July 1916 from 'B' and 'D' Squadrons, 4th Light Horse Regiment and a squadron of the New Zealand Otago Mounted Rifles Regiment and assigned to II Anzac Corps. It was disbanded in December 1918 and its personnel transferred to the 13th Light Horse Regiment and the II Anzac Corps Mounted Regiment.) and together earned nine battle honours on the Western Front.

=== Sinai and Palestine Campaign ===
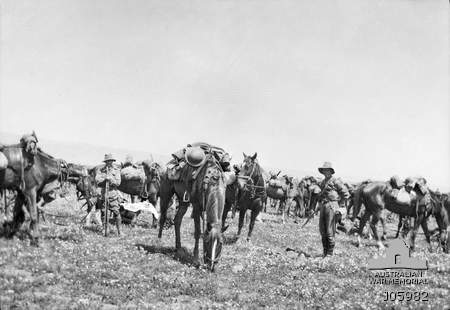
The 4th Light Horse in Egypt, after the war in 1919.

With only two squadrons remaining in Egypt, a new squadron was raised, confusingly also called 'B' Squadron. The regiment was then deployed in defence the Suez Canal, for the remainder of the year. In 1916, plans were made to convert the 4th Light Horse, along with the 11th and 12th Light Horse Regiments into cameleers, but this plan was not followed through. In April 1917, the regiment moved into the Sinai but were only used for rear area security. The regiment was then assigned to the 4th Light Horse Brigade, and on 31 October took part in its first large battle: the Battle of Beersheba, which was part of the wider Third Battle of Gaza. During the battle, the 4th and 12th Light Horse carried out a cavalry charge on the town of Beersheba, which has since become known as the "charge of Beersheba".

They were then involved in the advance into Palestine, before being rested in the early months of 1918. During the rest of the campaign the regiment took part in the Battle of Mughar Ridge, the Battle of Nebi Samwill, the capture of Jerusalem, the Battle of Es Sal and the Battle of Megiddo. A patrol from the regiment were among the first Allied troops to enter Damascus on 1 October 1918.

The Ottoman Empire signed the Armistice of Mudros on 30 October 1918, and the war in the Middle East ended. However, the regiment had to return to Egypt, where rioting had started in March 1919, and they were subsequently involved in policing duties. Finally, in June 1919, the regiment sailed for Australia where it was eventually disbanded. The regiment's involvement in the war cost them 105 killed and 332 wounded. (Note: Casualty totals are for Gallipoli and the Middle East only.)

== Perpetuation ==
In 1921, the decision was made to perpetuate the honours and traditions of the AIF by reorganising the units of the Citizens Force to replicate the numerical designations of their related AIF units. As a result, the 4th Light Horse was re-raised as a part-time unit based in the 3rd Military District, which encompassed the majority of the state of Victoria. Adopting the designation of the "Corangamite Light Horse", it assumed the lineage of several previously existing militia units, including the 20th Light Horse (Corangamite Light Horse) that had been formed in 1913. This unit traced its lineage back to the 11th Australian Light Horse Regiment (Victorian Mounted Rifles), which had been formed in 1903 as part of the amalgamation of Australia's colonial forces into the Australian Army after Federation.

In early 1936, the regiment was amalgamated with the 19th Light Horse to form the 4th/19th Light Horse. At the outbreak of the Second World War, the 4th/19th was assigned to the 3rd Cavalry Brigade, which was part of the 2nd Cavalry Division. In March 1942, the 4th/19th was split again and the 4th was re-raised as a motor regiment and undertook garrison duties in Australia. In 1943, it was gazetted as an AIF unit after the majority of its personnel volunteered to serve outside of Australian territory; nevertheless, it did not serve overseas and in June 1944, as the Australian Army undertook a partial demobilisation, the regiment was deemed surplus to requirements and was disbanded without having seen operational service during the war.

In the post war period, the regiment was re-raised as an amalgamated unit, designated the 4th/19th Prince of Wales's Light Horse. Formed in July 1948 as part of the Citizen Military Force, this unit was established as an armoured regiment within the 2nd Armoured Brigade. Throughout the early 1960s, this unit maintained a squadron of Regular personnel, but these were later transferred to the 1st Cavalry Regiment, which was later re-designated as the 2nd Cavalry Regiment. The 4th/19th remains part of the Australian Army Reserve and is currently part of the 2nd Division.

== Commanding officers ==
The following officers commanded the 4th Light Horse Regiment during the First World War:

- Lieutenant Colonel John Kealty Forsyth
- Lieutenant Colonel Leonard Long
- Lieutenant Colonel Murray William James Bourchier
- Lieutenant Colonel George James Rankin

== Battle honours ==
The 4th Light Horse Regiment was awarded the following battle honours:

- Messines 1917 · Ypres 1917 · Broodseinde · Passchendaele · Lys · Kemmel · Marne 1918 · Tardenois · France and Flanders 1916–1918 · ANZAC · Defence at ANZAC · Suvla · Sari Bair · Gallipoli 1915–1916 · Egypt 1915–1917 · Gaza-Beersheba · El Mughar · Nebi Samwill · Jerusalem · Jordan (Es Salt) · Megiddo.

== Notes ==
Footnotes

Citations

Bibliography

- Bou, Jean (2010a). Light Horse: A History of Australia's Mounted Arm. Port Melbourne, Victoria: Cambridge University Press. ISBN 978-0-52119-708-3.
- Festberg, Alfred (1972). The Lineage of the Australian Army. Melbourne, Victoria: Allara Publishing. ISBN 978-0-85887-024-6.
- Finlayson, David (2012). Green Fields Beyond. Canberra, Australian Capital Territory: Department of Veterans' Affairs. OCLC 799180097.
- Grey, Jeffrey (2008). A Military History of Australia (3rd ed.). Melbourne, Victoria: Cambridge University Press. ISBN 9780521697910.
- Gullett, Henry (1941). The Australian Imperial Force in Sinai and Palestine, 1914–1918. Official History of Australia in the War of 1914–1918. Vol. 7 (10th ed.). Sydney: Angus and Robertson. OCLC 220901683.
- Horner, David; Williams, Dr Peter (2010). Australia's Military History For Dummies. John Wiley and Sons. ISBN 978-1-74246-894-5.
