= 2nd Motor Brigade (Australia) =

Mounted formation of the Australian Army

- Active: 1921–1943
- Country: Australia
- Branch: Australian Army
- Type: Cavalry (1921–1942); Motorised infantry (1942–1943)
- Size: Brigade
- Part of: 1st Cavalry Division (1921–1942); 1st Motor Division (1942); 2nd Armoured Division (1942–1943)

Commanders
- Notable commanders: Brigadier W.E.H. Pascoe

Insignia
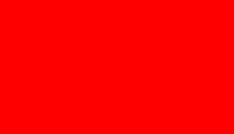
- Colour Patch

The 2nd Motor Brigade was a formation of the Australian Army during the interwar years and World War II. Initially raised in 1921 as the 2nd Cavalry Brigade in New South Wales, it was a part-time formation of the Militia. It consisted of three light horse regiments spread across several depots across the Hunter Valley and northern part of the state. During World War II, the brigade was mobilised for defensive duties in December 1941, and assumed positions along the northern coast to defend against a possible invasion. In early 1942, the brigade was converted into a motorised formation, and was redesignated as the 2nd Motor Brigade. In April 1943, when the threat of invasion had passed, it was disbanded and its manpower reallocated.

== History ==
The brigade was established as a formation of the part-time Militia in 1921, with the designation of the 2nd Cavalry Brigade. Based in regional New South Wales, it was headquartered in West Maitland and consisted of three light horse regiments – the 12th, 15th and 16th. These units were based in depots in the Hunter Valley and the northern part of the state including Armidale, Casino and West Maitland, with troops being drawn from the areas that had previously been assigned to the disbanded 2nd and 3rd Light Horse Brigades. By 1938, the brigade had been reduced to two regiments: the 12th/24th and 15th. It formed part of the 1st Cavalry Division, which was headquartered in Sydney.

During World War II, the brigade was mobilised for full-time service in December 1941 after Japan's entry into the war. At this time, the brigade's headquarters was located at Armidale, and in the event of an invasion was tasked with defending positions along the northern coast, and preventing an enemy force from advancing inland towards the Central Tablelands. The brigade's units were dispersed as follows: the 12th Light Horse Regiment at Armidale, the 15th Motor Regiment at Coffs Harbour, and the 24th Light Horse Regiment and 1st Machine Gun Regiment at Rutherford. This lasted until January 1942 when the brigade was re-oriented towards a flank defence role in support of the garrison covering Newcastle. This resulted in the headquarters moving to Gloucester while the 24th Light Horse moved firstly to Bulahdelah and then Stroud, with the 1st Machine Gun Regiment taking over positions around Dungog.

It did not see any active service at this time and was converted into the 2nd Motor Brigade in March 1942, as part of an effort to motorise or mechanise Australia's mounted forces in the early war years. The new brigade was assigned to the 1st Australian Motor Division, and was placed under the command of Brigadier W.E.H. Pascoe. At this time, each of the brigade's light horse regiments was converted into a motor regiment; such units were authorised to operate 14 scout cars and 44 Universal carriers. Following the arrival of the 1st Motor Division's headquarters in Rutherford, the 2nd Motor Brigade headquarters moved to Dungog, co-located with the 1st Motor Regiment, while the 24th Motor Regiment remained at Stroud. The 16th Motor Regiment at Newcastle temporarily came under brigade's command until it was sent to Gympie, Queensland, to reinforce the 1st Motor Brigade in April 1942.

In May 1942, the armoured forces were restructured, and the 2nd Motor Brigade lost the 1st Motor Regiment, which became the 1st Army Tank Battalion and was reassigned to the 3rd Army Tank Brigade. Meanwhile, the 24th Motor Regiment was disbanded. Brigade headquarters moved to Taree, where it was re-formed. With the disbandment of the 4th Motor Brigade, two of its motor regiments – the 6th and 7th – joined the 2nd Motor Brigade moving to Kempsey and Taree respectively. Meanwhile, the 12th Motor Regiment re-joined the brigade, although it remained at Coffs Harbour until July when the 1st Motor Division's headquarters moved there, freeing up the 12th to move further south, around Kempsey, so that it could concentrate closer to brigade headquarters. This resulted in the 6th Motor Regiment moving to Taree at this time.

In late 1942, the Australian government sought to raise two Militia armoured divisions – the 2nd and 3rd. These formations were to be established on the light scale, to complement the 1st Armoured Division, which had been raised as part of the Second Australian Imperial Force. The brigade was assigned to the 2nd Armoured Division, and a significant restructure took place. The 6th Motor Regiment was converted into an armoured car regiment and became a divisional asset, while the 12th Motor Regiment also became an armoured car regiment and was transferred to the 3rd Armoured Division, and the 7th Motor Regiment was disbanded. To replace these losses, the 2nd Motor Brigade received the 15th, 17th and 20th Motor Regiments. These units moved to Wallgrove in November 1942 as part of their concentration prior to joining the 2nd Armoured Division.

In February 1943, the brigade moved to Gherang, Victoria, but around this time the 20th Motor Regiment was sent to Queensland to reinforce the 2nd Armoured Brigade and the 15th Motor Regiment was sent to Western Australia to join the 1st Armoured Brigade. This left just the 17th Motor Regiment and the brigade's headquarters in Victoria. The brigade did not see any active service and was disbanded at Gherang in April 1943, as part of a draw down of Australia's armoured forces that was undertaken once the threat of an invasion had passed. At this time, the Australian government decided to reallocate some of the manpower that had been tied up in the armoured divisions to other formations that would be used for jungle warfare, or to civilian industry.

One of the brigade's former units, the 20th Motor Regiment, was subsequently deployed to Merauke, in Dutch New Guinea, as part of Merauke Force to undertake defensive duties. In February 1945, the 20th Motor Regiment was converted into a pioneer battalion and was renamed the 20th Pioneer Battalion. Of the four companies subsequently raised, No. 3 Pioneer Company served in New Guinea before the end of the war.

== Brigade units ==
The following units served with the brigade as a cavalry brigade:

- 12th Light Horse
- 15th Light Horse
- 16th Light Horse (MG)
- 24th Light Horse Regiment
- 1st Light Horse (later designated the 1st Light Horse (Machine Gun) Regiment)

The following units served with the brigade as a motor brigade:

- 1st Motor Regiment
- 12th Motor Regiment
- 24th Motor Regiment
- 16th Motor Regiment
- 6th Motor Regiment
- 7th Motor Regiment
- 15th Motor Regiment
- 17th Motor Regiment
- 20th Motor Regiment
- 1st Field Squadron, Royal Australian Engineers

== See also ==
- List of Australian Army brigades
