= 6th Motor Brigade (Australia) =

Formation of the Australian Army during World War II

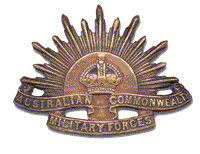
- Active: 1942
- Country: Australia
- Allegiance: Australian
- Branch: Australian Light Horse
- Type: Motorised
- Role: Motorised infantry brigade
- Size: Brigade
- Part of: 2nd Motor Division
- Garrison/HQ: Adelaide
- Equipment: Trucks, universal carriers

Insignia
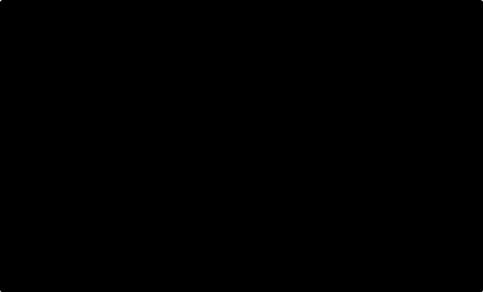
- Unit colour patch

The 6th Motor Brigade was a militia formation of the Australian Army, which was formed during World War II. Formed in February 1942 from the previously existing 6th Cavalry Brigade, the brigade undertook defensive duties in Victoria before being converted into an armoured formation in May 1942.

== History ==
The 6th Motor Brigade was descended from the Adelaide based 6th Cavalry Brigade, which was formed from the existing 8th Light Horse Brigade in the reorganisation of the Army in 1921. Upon the declaration of war in 1939, the brigade was placed on a war footing. Following the invasion of Malaya, attack on Pearl Harbor and fall of Singapore, the 6th was called up for full-time service, carrying out defensive duties in Australia. The evolution of Australia's mounted forces, the Australian Light Horse, had lagged well behind that of other countries who had converted their horse mounted cavalry to motorised (trucks) or mechanised (armoured fighting vehicles) forces in the 1930s and 1940s, but the advent of war provided the impetus for change. In the early phase of the war, the brigade was tasked with forming a district reserve, and defending positions along the Onkaparinga and Sturt Rivers, in South Australia.

Consequently, the 6th Cavalry Brigade became the 6th Motor Brigade in February 1942, and its subordinate units were also motorised. The 3rd, 9th and 18th Light Horse regiments were directed to reorganise and re-equip as "motor regiments", which were effectively lorry/truck borne motorised infantry, similar to the British Motor Battalions, US Armoured Infantry or German Panzer Grenadier units. The 3rd Motor Regiment was formed from two reconnaissance squadrons – the 3rd and 23rd – while the 18th was converted from a light horse machine gun regiment.

The brigade's existence proved short lived and most units never completed the process of motorisation. As part of the broader mechanisation and motorisation of the 2nd Motor Division, which would become the 2nd Armoured Division, the 6th Cavalry Brigade was converted to a mechanised formation, the 6th Armoured Brigade in May 1942. They subsequently joined the 3rd Motor Brigade and other divisional troops, in Victoria, concentrating in Gherang in June before moving to Puckapunyal in July to begin receiving armoured vehicles.

== Brigade units ==
The following units served with the brigade during its brief existence:

- 9th Motor Regiment
- 18th Motor Regiment
- 3rd Motor Regiment

== See also ==
- List of Australian Army brigades
