= 2/9th Field Regiment (Australia) =

- Active: 1940–45
- Country: Australia
- Branch: Australian Military Forces
- Type: Regiment
- Role: Artillery
- Size: 3 batteries
- Part of: 1st Australian Corps
- Engagements: World War II

The 2/9th Field Regiment was an Australian Army artillery regiment formed as part of the all volunteer Second Australian Imperial Force in July 1940 for operations during World War II. Assigned to the 1st Australian Corps, the regiment was sent to the Middle East in mid-1941, and served in Palestine, Egypt, and Syria before returning to Australia in 1942. It undertook defensive duties in south-east Queensland before deploying north to Merauke, in Dutch New Guinea, and Cape York. It returned to Australia in October 1944 and sent to the Atherton Tablelands to carry out training as it waited for further deployment. This never came and the regiment was disbanded in late 1945.

== History ==
The 2/9th was formed in July 1940, as part of the all-volunteer Second Australian Imperial Force, the regiment was raised at Holsworthy, New South Wales, from men largely drawn from that state. Its first commanding officer was Lieutenant Colonel G.R.L Adams, and it was initially assigned to the 8th Division. Upon establishment, the regiment initially consisted of two batteries – the 17th and 18th – but was expanded to three in October 1941 with the addition of 59th Battery, while the regiment was deployed to Syria. Two of the regiment's troops were equipped with 4.5-inch howitzers. The remainder of the regiment used Ordnance QF 25-pounders, although the regiment's initial training took place on Ordnance QF 18-pounders and some of these vintage guns were used by the regiment later in the war while undertaking garrison duties in Dutch New Guinea.

The regiment concentrated at Ingleburn in September, but later moved back to Holsworthy. After a reorganisation of the 2nd AIF, and the creation of the 9th Division, in November 1940, the regiment subsequently became part of the corps artillery of the 1st Australian Corps. At this time, the regiment was redesignated as the "2/9th Army Field Regiment". Training was undertaken at Holsworthy before the regiment embarked for the Middle East in April 1941. After concentrating in Palestine in May, the regiment was redeployed to Alexandria, in Egypt, and was used to support British troops on alert to defend against a possible German airborne invasion in the wake of Battle of Crete. The following month, the regiment was deployed to the Syria–Lebanon campaign where it was largely used to support British forces from the 23rd Infantry Brigade around Merdjayoun, although the regiment's two 4.5-inch howitzer troops supported the Australian 7th Division. The campaign concluded with an armistice in July, after which the 23rd Infantry Brigade was relieved by the Australian 18th Infantry Brigade, and as a result the regiment was reassigned to the 7th Division with which it carried out occupation duties.

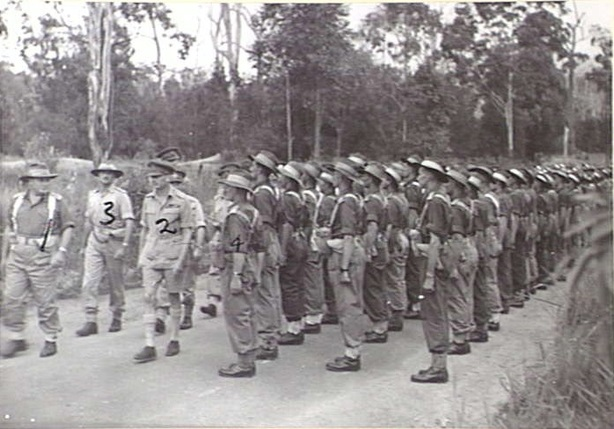
Troops from the 2/9th on parade at Wondecla, Queensland, February 1945

Following Japan's entry into the war, the Australian government sought to bring a large number of troops back from the Middle East to meet the new threat. In February 1942, the regiment moved to Khassa, in Palestine, and it was subsequently brought back to Australia as part of Operation Stepsister. Landing in Adelaide, South Australia, in March 1942, the regiment was slowly moved east, marrying up with their guns at Springbank the following month, and moving on to Esk, Queensland, and then Arakoon, in June. In October 1942, it was reassigned to the 3rd Division for defensive duties in south-east Queensland, moving between Buderim, Maroochydore and Caboolture. In mid-1943, it was allocated to Merauke Force and sent to garrison Merauke in Dutch New Guinea with the 17th and 59th Batteries, and Cape York with the 18th Battery, and was reallocated the 4th Division. While deployed, the regiment's personnel were largely used to complete construction tasks. The regiment returned to its original designation of the "2/9th Field Regiment" in June 1944. The 18th Battery was redeployed from Cape York to Wondecla on the Atherton Tablelands in September by road, while the 17th and 59th Batteries departed Merauke by sea in October 1944. After a month-long interlude on Thursday Island, they disembarked at Brisbane in November.

A period of leave followed, after which the regiment was reconstituted at Wondecla, returning to the control of the 1st Australian Corps. There were limited combat opportunities for Australian forces around this time, as US forces had taken over as the main combat force in the Pacific. The reduced artillery scale of the jungle converted divisions also limited the opportunities for artillery regiments. The regiment was not deployed to Borneo when 1st Corps deployed and it was subsequently reassigned to the 11th Division in April 1945. A further change of assignment came in July when it was transferred to the 5th Division, at which time the regiment moved to Kairi, where it remained until war's end. The regiment was disbanded in late 1945. A total of 1,458 men served in the regiment throughout the war. One member was decorated, Major A.R. Blair, who received a Mention in Despatches for service in Merauke. Three members of the regiment were killed in action while serving with other units.

== Commanding officers ==
The following officers served as commanding officer of the 2/9th:

- Lieutenant Colonel G.R.L Adams;
- Lieutenant Colonel D.H.I Irvine;
- Lieutenant Colonel C.E. Chapman;
- Lieutenant Colonel R. Bale.
