= 8th Combat Service Support Battalion (Australia) =

Australian Army unit

- Active: 1 July 1995 – 17 December 2023
- Country: Australia
- Branch: Army
- Type: Logistics and health support
- Size: Headquarters and four sub-units
- Part of: 5th Brigade
- Garrison/HQ: HQ at Timor Barracks, Dundas (Sydney)
- Mascot: Gigas Bat

Commanders
- Last Commanding Officer: Lieutenant Colonel Michelle Dare

8th Combat Service Support Battalion (8 CSSB) was a unit of the 5th Brigade of the Australian Army. Originally formed as 8th Brigade Administrative Support Battalion (8 BASB) in 1995, 8 CSSB was a part-time Army (Reserve) unit with elements at Timor Barracks at Dundas (Sydney) and the Bullecourt Barracks at Adamstown (Newcastle). At various times in the past, the unit has had elements at Erina, Taree and Pymble. On 17 December 2023, 8 CSSB completed its transition into 5th Combat Service Support Battalion.

== Role ==
The role of 8 CSSB was to provide first and limited second line support to its customer units within the 5th Brigade along with its counterpart unit the 5th Combat Service Support Battalion, of which it was absorbed into in 2023.

== Battalion Composition ==
8 CSSB comprised a battalion headquarters and four sub-units:

- 1st Health Company
- 16th Transport Squadron (now carrying the 8 CSSB Mascot as a part of 5 CSSB)
- 111th Workshop Company

== Former Commanding Officers ==
- Lieutenant Colonel Stuart Jones RFD (1996–1997)
- Lieutenant Colonel Robyn Cragg CSM RFD (1998–1999)
- Lieutenant Colonel Martin Wiltshire RFD (2000–2001)
- Lieutenant Colonel Russ Mullins CSC (2002–2003)
- Lieutenant Colonel Allan Murray (2004–2005)
- Lieutenant Colonel Anthony McBride (2006–2007)
- Lieutenant Colonel Bill Cowham (2008–2010)
- Lieutenant Colonel Ed McCann (2011–2013)
- Lieutenant Colonel Amanda Williamson (2014–2015)
- Lieutenant Colonel Jodie Lording CSM (2016–2017)
- Lieutenant Colonel Michelle Dare (2018–2019)
