= 62nd Battalion (Australia) =

- Active: 1917; 1942–44
- Country: Australia
- Branch: Australian Army
- Type: Infantry
- Part of: Merauke Force
- Nickname: Merauke Regiment
- Colours: Purple beside green
- Engagements: World War II

Insignia
- Unit colour patch

The 62nd Battalion was an infantry battalion of the Australian Army. It was first raised in 1917 during World War I but was disbanded before seeing active service. During World War II the battalion was re-raised in 1942 as a unit of the Militia and was tasked with undertaking garrison duty in Dutch New Guinea, where they defended Merauke from possible Japanese attack. In 1944, the battalion was disbanded and its personnel distributed to units of the 9th Division as reinforcements.

== History ==
The battalion was initially formed in the United Kingdom during World War I as part of the effort to raise a 6th Division of the Australian Imperial Force (AIF). Established on 25 April 1917 it was assigned to the 17th Brigade before being transferred to the 16th Brigade on 16 May 1917. It was disbanded on 16 September 1917, however, due to manpower shortages that resulted from heavy losses amongst the Australian Corps in France during the fighting around Bullecourt and Messines, which, coupled with the shortage of reinforcements due to the reduced number of volunteers and the failure of attempts to introduce conscription, meant that the 6th Division had to be broken up and its personnel dispersed in order to reinforce the other five Australian divisions.

During World War II, the battalion was re-raised on 29 December 1942 as a unit of the Militia. At this time, the battalion drew its personnel from the 14th Garrison Battalion, a close defence unit that was stationed on Thursday Island. On establishment, the battalion adopted the territorial designation of the "Merauke Regiment". This unit had been raised in November 1940 to defend coastal guns around Bribie Island, Fort Cowan Cowan and Fort Lytton, before moving to north Queensland in mid-1942 to airfields and gun batteries around Cairns, Horn Island, Cape York and Thursday Island.

The 62nd Battalion was gazetted as an AIF unit shortly after its formation, which meant that it could be deployed outside of Australian territory, and in January 1943, the 62nd sailed to Merauke, in Dutch New Guinea as part of Merauke Force. While defending Merauke's airstrip and port, the 62nd also carried out patrolling operations and undertook other garrison duties such as constructing defences, building roads and unloading ships. They remained at Merauke until February 1944 when the 62nd Battalion was relieved by the 20th Motor Regiment and returned to Australia, arriving in Brisbane in March. They then moved to Mount Stuart, near Townsville where they remained until they were disbanded in May 1944, as nearly 400 men from the battalion were transferred to the units of the 9th Division to make up for its losses during the operations around Lae, Finschhafen and Sattelberg. The majority of the battalion's personnel were sent to the 2/15th Battalion, subsequently taking part in the Borneo campaign in 1945.

During the war, three of the battalion's personnel died or were killed while on active service. It received one battle honour for its service, that of "South-West Pacific 1942–44".

== Commanding officers ==
The following officers served as commanding officer of the 62nd Battalion:

- Lieutenant Colonel Alexander Graham Keith Haupt;
- Captain Percy McCoy.
