= 33rd Brigade (Australia) =

Infantry brigade of the Australian Army during 1945-46

- Active: 1945–1946
- Country: Australia
- Allegiance: Australian Crown
- Branch: Australian Army
- Type: Infantry
- Role: Occupation duties
- Size: 3 infantry battalions

Commanders
- Notable commanders: William Steele; Hugh Wrigley

The 33rd Brigade was a formation of the Australian Army established at the end of World War II. Formed in August 1945 at Morotai Island, it consisted of three Australian Imperial Force infantry battalions that were raised for occupation duties in the Dutch East Indies following Japan's surrender. After deployment to Timor and Ambon, it returned to Morotai when Dutch colonial rule was re-established. It was disbanded in early 1946 and its personnel demobilised.

== History ==
The 33rd Brigade was formed in late August 1945 at Morotai Island. Initially the force was under the command of Brigadier Lewis Dyke, a regular Army artillery officer, who began organising the brigade before being called to fly to Darwin, where he began preparing for deployment to Timor. He subsequently led the first troops to Timor – including elements of the 33rd Brigade – becoming commander of Timor Force. Command of the brigade later passed to Brigadier William Steele, who remained in the role until November 1945 when Brigadier Hugh Wrigley took over. The brigade's staff was drawn from the disbanded I Corps headquarters. Upon establishment, the brigade consisted of the 12th/40th, 63rd, and 64th Infantry Battalions. Its constituent units were raised over the course of several months in mid- to late-1945: the 12th/40th in June 1945 in the Northern Territory, and 63rd and 64th in August 1945 on Morotai. The 63rd and 64th Battalions were initially raised as the 1st and 2nd Australian Reinforcement Infantry Battalions, but were re-designated shortly after being raised. All three units were formed as part of the all volunteer Australian Imperial Force.

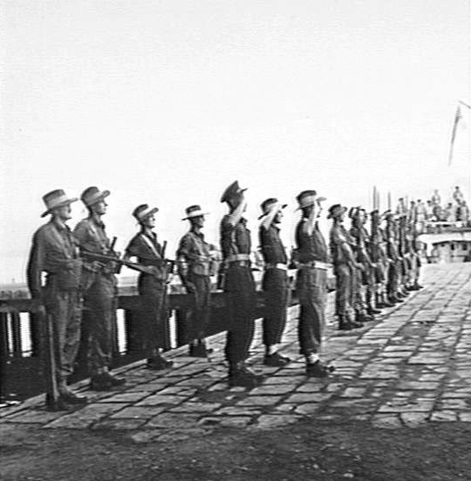
Shore party from the 33rd Brigade at Ambon, September 1945

Under Dyke's command, the 12th/40th deployed from Darwin to Timor in early September. They arrived at Koepang, in the middle of the month, shortly after the Japanese surrender on 11 September, which took place on board the survey ship HMS Moresby, in Dyke's presence just prior to him handing over as 33rd Brigade commander. At Koepang, the 12th/40th established themselves in former Dutch barracks and began patrolling and internal security duties. This included collecting Japanese prisoners of war, distributing food and supplies, identifying war criminals and overseeing Japanese security details and work parties, collecting weapons and ammunition, and reconstruction efforts. Arrangements were also made to return around 200 Australian former prisoners of war back to Darwin.

Initially, it had been planned to deploy the entire brigade to Timor; however, in mid-September it was determined the situation was stable and that the rest of the brigade would deploy to Ambon, as well as sending smaller elements to the Kai, Aru and Tanimbar Islands. At this point, Steele assumed command of the brigade, and deployed an advanced party of 100 troops on Ambon from HMAS Glenelg on 22 September. These troops came from the 64th Battalion deploying from Morotai, with the remainder of the battalion arriving on 27 September. They were joined by the 63rd Battalion in early October. On Ambon, Steele took the Japanese surrender from Vice Admiral Ichise Shin'ichi, and carried out his interrogation.

On Ambon, where the brigade headquarters was established, its duties included providing personnel to support war crimes trials and details to assist war graves units. There were also about 800 Australian former prisoners of war at Ambon who needed repatriation, and parade details undertook ceremonial duties as war cemeteries were established. Beyond the main areas where units of Australian troops were established, small surveillance parties were dispatched to areas in western New Guinea, as well as the Talaud Islands, Halmahera and Ternate. These parties were tasked with collecting information regarding war crimes and monitoring the Japanese efforts to maintain law and order, which led to several clashes between local civilians and the remaining Japanese.

Established as an interim measure to occupy the Indies until the Dutch could return, as the Dutch forces began arriving in December 1945, the Australians began winding up their operations although they would continue for several more months. On 19 March 1946, the 12th/40th Battalion ceased operations on Timor. Around this time, the brigade returned to Morotai where its headquarters was closed. Its constituent units were also disbanded, and personnel returned to Australia for demobilisation.

Although the headquarters of most brigades of the Army that were raised during the war were allocated a Unit Colour Patch, none were assigned to the 33rd Brigade.

== See also ==
- List of Australian Army brigades

== Bibliography ==
- Coulthard-Clark, C. D. (2002). "Wrigley, Hugh (1891–1980)". Australian Dictionary of Biography. Canberra: National Centre of Biography, Australian National University. ISBN 978-0-522-84459-7. ISSN 1833-7538. OCLC 70677943.
- Festberg, Alfred (1972). The Lineage of the Australian Army. Melbourne, Victoria: Allara Publishing. ISBN 978-0-85887-024-6.
- Fitzpatrick, Georgina; McCormack, Timothy; Morris, Narrelle (2016). Australia's War Crimes Trials 1945–51. International Humanitarian Law Series. BRILL. ISBN 9789004292055.
- Long, Gavin (1963). The Final Campaigns. Australia in the War of 1939–1945. Canberra: Australian War Memorial. OCLC 1297619.
- McKenzie-Smith, Graham (2018). The Unit Guide: The Australian Army 1939–1945, Volume 2. Warriewood, New South Wales: Big Sky Publishing. ISBN 978-1-925675-146.
