= 20th Pioneer Battalion (Australia) =

Former Australian Army unit

20th Light Horse Regiment (1918–1941) 20th Motor Regiment (1941–1945) 20th Pioneer Battalion (1945)
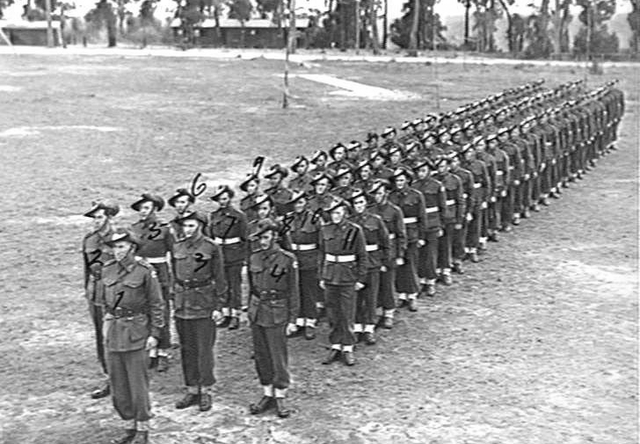
- 20th Pioneer Battalion soldiers on parade, Sydney, May 1945
- Active: 1918–1945
- Branch: Australian Army
- Type: Light horse (1918–1941); Motorised infantry (1941–1945); Pioneer (1945)
- Size: Battalion
- Part of: 3rd Cavalry Brigade; 2nd Armoured Brigade; 2nd Motor Brigade; Merauke Force

Insignia
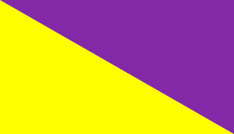
- Unit colour patch 1918–1941

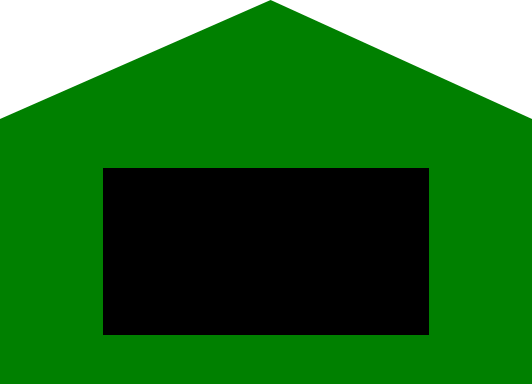
- 1941–1945

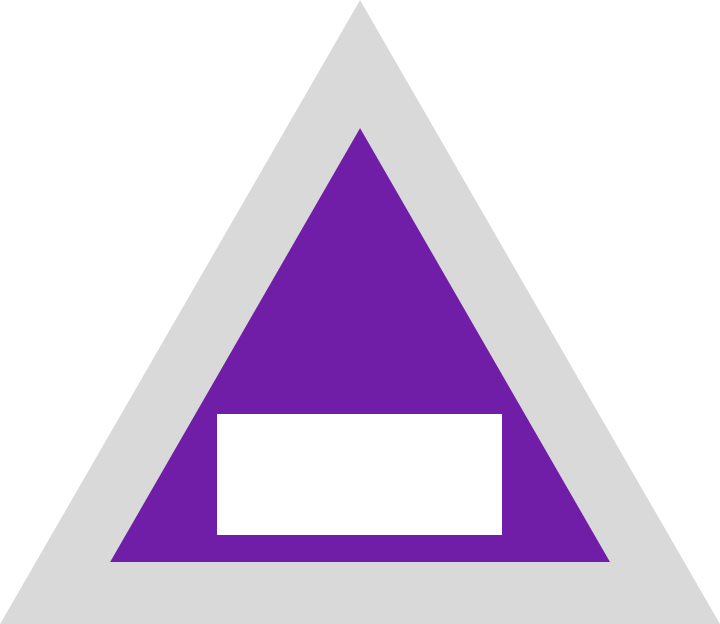
- 1945

The 20th Pioneer Battalion was an Australian Army pioneer unit that served in New Guinea during World War II. A Militia unit, the battalion was originally formed as a light horse regiment in 1918. Through the 20th Light Horse Regiment, the unit drew lineage back to early Victorian colonial forces, raised in 1885. During the early part of World War II, the unit was converted from a light horse regiment to a motorised unit – the 20th Motor Regiment – and undertook defensive duties in Victoria and then Queensland. In 1944, it deployed in a dismounted role to Merauke in Dutch New Guinea, to defend the Allied airfield that had been constructed there. The unit was later converted into a pioneer battalion in early 1945, deploying to New Guinea in the final stages of the war. It was disbanded in November 1945.

== History ==
A unit of the part-time Militia, the battalion was formed as a pioneer unit in February 1945, when it was converted from the 20th Motor Regiment. The unit's lineage was convoluted. Having been converted from the 20th Motor Regiment, it traced its lineage through the 20th Light Horse Regiment (Victorian Mounted Rifles), which had been formed in 1918. This unit had evolved from the 15th Light Horse Regiment (Victorian Mounted Rifles), which had been formed in 1912 from the 7th Australian Light Horse (Victorian Mounted Rifles). The 7th had been raised in 1902 from the Victorian volunteer forces which had previously contributed personnel to contingents deployed by the state as part of the Imperial Bushmen to the Second Boer War. Lineage was also claimed to early Victorian colonial forces, which adopted the designation of the Victorian Mounted Rifles when raised in 1885.

These units had been assigned to the 3rd and 5th Light Horse Brigades before World War I. During the war, the regiment provided manpower to several First Australian Imperial Force light horse regiments, including the 4th, 8th and 13th, but did not deploy as a formed body. The 4th and 8th Light Horse Regiments served in the Gallipoli Campaign, in Egypt, and in the Sinai and Palestine campaign in 1915–1918, while the 13th served on the Western Front.

In 1921, the Australian Army was reorganised following the demobilisation of the wartime forces, and the 20th Light Horse Regiment was assigned to the 3rd Cavalry Brigade, as a part-time unit based in Victoria. During the interwar years, the 20th Light Horse Regiment maintained depots in Seymour, Shepparton, Tatura, Melbourne, Yea, Mansfield, Alexandra, Numurkah, Broadford, Tocumwal, Finley and Nathalia, and formed part of the 2nd Cavalry Division.

In the early part of World War II, the 20th Light Horse Regiment drew personnel from the Murray River region of Victoria, and in December 1941 was mobilised for full time service. They were converted into a motor regiment around this time, while based at Torquay. Assigned a defensive role to protect Melbourne in the event of an invasion, they were tasked with securing landing beaches around Barwon Heads and Anglesea. In early 1942, the regiment handed over its positions to the 23rd/21st Infantry Battalion, and moved to Colac, as it was re-orientated towards the defence of Geelong. In April 1942, the 20th Motor Regiment was sent to Puckapunyal and was assigned to the 2nd Armoured Brigade, to complete its establishment. Collective training with the rest of the 1st Armoured Division took place in Wee Waa, New South Wales, in August; however, a reorganisation followed which resulted in the 20th Motor Regiment being transferred to the 2nd Motor Brigade, within the 2nd Armoured Division. Concentrating at Wallgrove, New South Wales, in February 1943, the brigade prepared to move to Victoria; however, the 20th Motor Regiment was diverted to Murgon, Queensland, rejoining the 2nd Armoured Brigade as it was decided that the 2nd Armoured Division was to be disbanded.

Throughout 1943 and 1944, Australia's armoured forces were reduced as manpower requirements elsewhere resulted in the disbandment of many units. Nevertheless, in early 1944, the 20th Motor Regiment was chosen to deploy to Dutch New Guinea to undertake a defensive role as a dismounted motorised infantry regiment. In February 1944, the regiment arrived at Merauke, replacing the 62nd Infantry Battalion within Merauke Force. In this role, it was assigned to defend the airfield from a potential Japanese attack aimed at the Allied western flank. However, the fighting in New Guinea and elsewhere in the Pacific in 1943–1944 had pushed the Japanese back, and the threat to Merauke had diminished. As a result, throughout 1944 the garrison there was slowly reduced. In February 1945, the 20th Motor Regiment embarked for Australia, and moved to Glenfield, New South Wales. After a period of leave, the unit was converted into a pioneer battalion. Four companies were raised. Of these, No. 3 Pioneer Company served in the Territory of New Guinea before the end of the war. The remaining companies were assigned to relieve the 4th Infantry Battalion at Madang.

The battalion was disbanded on 15 November 1945. In the post war period, the unit was perpetuated by the 8th/13th Victorian Mounted Rifles, which remained on the order of battle until the early 1990s when it was merged with the 4th/19th Prince of Wales's Light Horse. The unit's guidon was entrusted to the 8th/13th during this period.

== Battle honours ==
The unit held the following battle honours:

- South Africa 1899–1902
- Anzac, Gallipoli 1915, Egypt 1915–17, Palestine 1917–18
- South West Pacific Area 1944–45

Of these, all but the last battle honour was inherited.
