= 4th Motor Brigade =

Motorised brigade of the Australian Army during World War II

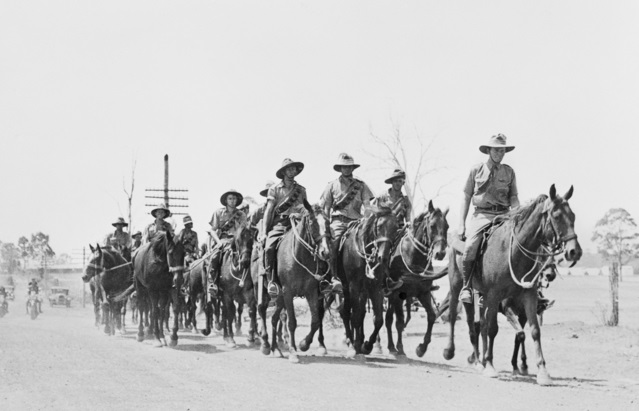
- On exercise near Wallgrove, February 1940
- Active: 1921–1942
- Country: Australia
- Allegiance: Australian Crown
- Branch: Australian Army
- Type: Cavalry (1921–1942); Motorised infantry (1942)
- Size: Brigade
- Part of: 1st Cavalry Division; 1st Motor Division

Insignia
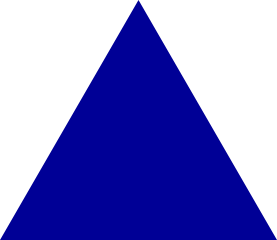
- Unit colour patch

The 4th Motor Brigade was a formation of the Australian Army during the interwar years and the early part of the World War II. A formation of the part-time Militia, the brigade was formed in 1921 as the 4th Cavalry Brigade. At this time, it consisted of three light horse regiments based in southern and western New South Wales. During World War II, the brigade was mobilised for defensive duties in December 1941, and assumed positions along the southern New South Wales coast to defend against a possible invasion. It was converted into the 4th Motor Brigade in March 1942 when it was motorised. As a motor brigade, the 4th undertook defensive duties on the south coast of New South Wales before it was converted into an armoured formation, designated the 3rd Army Tank Brigade in May 1942.

== History ==
The 4th Cavalry Brigade was raised as a formation of the part-time Militia in 1921. Its headquarters was established in Paddington, Sydney with the brigade's area of responsibility stretching across southern and western New South Wales. At the time, it consisted of the 1st, 6th, 7th, and 21st Light Horse Regiments. By 1927, the brigade consisted of the 1st, 6th and 7th Light Horse, as the 21st had been reassigned as divisional cavalry. These regiments were based in Parramatta, Orange and Goulburn, with troops being drawn from areas previously assigned to the disbanded 3rd and 4th Light Horse Brigades. By 1938, the 21st had returned to the brigade, and the 1st Light Horse had been converted to a machine gun regiment.

During World War II, the brigade was assigned to the 1st Australian Cavalry Division. Following Japan's entry into the war in December 1941, the brigade was mobilised for full time service. It was concentrated at Cowra, initially but moved to Bowral, in February 1942. There, the brigade was assigned a defensive role to cover the southern New South Wales coast and in the event of an invasion was to prevent an enemy force from advancing towards the Central Tablelands. At this time, the brigade's constituent units were the 6th Motor Regiment based at Nowra, the 7th Light Horse Regiment at Dapto, the 14th Machine Gun Regiment at Berrima, and the 3rd Armoured Regiment at Goulburn and Moruya.

The brigade did not see any active service and was converted into the 4th Australian Motor Brigade in March 1942, as part of ongoing efforts to motorise or mechanise Australia's mounted forces in the early war years. As a result of this, the brigade's three light horse regiments – the 6th, 7th and 14th – were converted into motor regiments; each regiment was authorised to operate 14 scout cars and 44 Universal carriers. It also possessed a single armoured regiment: the 3rd. They continued their previously assigned defensive role on the south coast of New South Wales.

The brigade was assigned to the 1st Australian Motor Division on formation and did not see any active service. In May 1942, the brigade was converted again, this time becoming the 3rd Army Tank Brigade. When it was converted to an armoured role, one the brigade's motor regiments – the 14th – was disbanded while the 6th and 7th transferred to the 2nd Motor Brigade. The 3rd Armoured Regiment was converted into the 3rd Army Tank Battalion, and joined two other such battalions, which were formed to provide close support to infantry in combat. The 3rd Army Tank Brigade moved to Largs, and the brigade's positions on the southern New South Wales coast were reassigned to the 2nd Infantry Division.

== Brigade units ==
The following units served with the brigade as a cavalry formation during the war:

- 3rd Armoured Regiment
- 1st Light Horse (Machine Gun)
- 6th Light Horse Regiment
- 7th Light Horse Regiment
- 14th Light Horse Regiment (Machine Gun)
- 21st Light Horse Regiment
- 6th Motor Regiment

The following units served with the brigade as a motorised formation during the war:

- 3rd Armoured Regiment
- 6th Motor Regiment
- 7th Motor Regiment
- 14th Motor Regiment

== See also ==
- List of Australian Army brigades
