= Merauke Force =

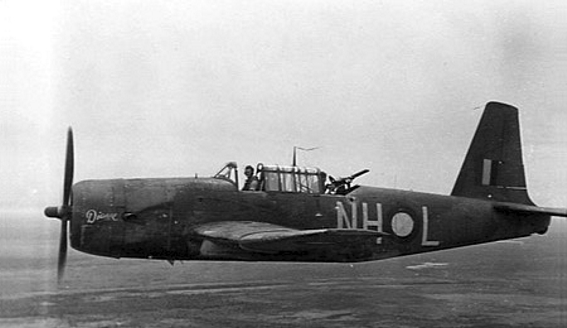
- A No. 12 Squadron RAAF Vengeance based at Merauke
- Active: 1942–45
- Country: Australia; United States; Netherlands East Indies
- Size: Brigade
- Garrison/HQ: Merauke

Merauke Force was an Australian-led military force of World War II which was responsible for defending Merauke in Dutch New Guinea from Japanese attack amidst the Pacific War. The force was established in late 1942 and was disbanded at the end of the war, having never seen combat. The Japanese attack did not eventuate and from mid-1944 the force was progressively drawn down and its assigned units redeployed to Australia or elsewhere in the Pacific. At its height, Merauke Force included troops from Australia, the Netherlands East Indies and the United States, as well as several squadrons of aircraft, including a joint Australian-Dutch fighter unit.

== History ==
In mid-1942, Merauke, on the south coast of Dutch New Guinea was one of only a few parts of the Netherlands East Indies (NEI) that had not been occupied by Japanese forces, as the terrain had precluded further exploitation. It was garrisoned by a company of infantry from the Royal Netherlands East Indies Army (KNIL), equipped with the majority of the heavy weapons available to the KNIL. The strategic location of Merauke on the western flank of Allied forces in Papua led Allied commanders to order the building of an airfield there. On 6 August 1942, a company-sized detachment, Company F, from the US Army's 46th Engineer Battalion arrived to commence construction.

On 31 December 1942, Merauke Force was formed, to reinforce the KNIL garrison. At the time of its establishment the force comprised C Company of the Australian 62nd Infantry Battalion, the 1st NEI Fusilier Company and various Royal Australian Air Force units. C Company, 62nd Infantry Battalion arrived at Merauke to reinforce the NEI company and RAAF on 7 January 1943. The remainder of the 62nd Battalion arrived on 1 February and an artillery battery arrived on 19 March.

The Australian force at Merauke was gradually expanded to a full brigade during the first half of 1943, after which Brigadier John Stevenson assumed command. This would see the garrison expanded to around 4,200 personnel (including 3,500 ground troops) by July 1943. As part of this build up, the headquarters of the 11th Brigade arrived on 28 April, and was redesignated Headquarters Merauke Force. The headquarters of No. 72 Wing, consisting of Nos. 12, 84, and 86 Squadrons, began arriving at Merauke in April and May 1943. Initially, No. 84 Squadron, operating CAC Boomerang fighter aircraft, was used in the air defence role over Merauke, flying patrols over the area from Horn Island; in July, after the airfield was completed, the Kittyhawk fighters and Vengeance dive bombers of Nos. 86 and 12 Squadrons arrived at Merauke. A radar station was also established at this time. Meanwhile, B Company, 2/3rd Machine Gun Battalion arrived at Merauke on 2 July and the 31st/51st Infantry Battalion on 6 July. A Company, 26th Infantry Battalion was added to the force between 29 May and 2 August when it was flown into the inland town of Tanahmerah. The 52nd Composite Anti-Aircraft Regiment was formed in September from previously independent anti-aircraft batteries. The 62nd Infantry Battalion returned to Australia in February 1944 and was replaced by the 20th Motor Regiment.

In April 1944, the Allies began to plan an offensive along New Guinea's south coast using elements of Merauke Force. In keeping with this more active role Merauke Force Headquarters was renamed Headquarters 11th Brigade. The 2/9th Field Regiment arrived at Merauke in March 1944 but the machine gun company returned to Australia in May 1944 as the threat of attack against Merauke declined. No. 120 (Netherlands East Indies) Squadron RAAF, a joint Australian-Dutch unit that was equipped with Kittyhawk fighters, began arriving at Merauke in early May 1944 from Canberra where it had been formed in December 1943. Upon arrival, the squadron joined other RAAF units at Merauke that formed part of No. 72 Wing, replacing No. 86 Squadron. No. 120 Squadron began combat operations in June 1944. While the other RAAF units departed Merauke in late 1944, No. 120 Squadron remained.

The planned offensive along New Guinea's south coast did not eventuate and it was decided to reduce the force at Merauke in mid-1944. The 11th Brigade Headquarters returned to Australia on 6 August. The 31st/51st Infantry Battalion, A Company, 26th Infantry Battalion and 2/9th Field Artillery Regiment followed in later in August and September. This left the 20th Motor Regiment as the main unit at Merauke and the regiment's headquarters commanded the forces in the region under the designation Headquarters Merauke Area. The 20th Motor Regiment returned to Australia in February 1945 and command of the area passed to the 52nd Composite Anti-Aircraft Regiment. No. 120 Squadron moved to Darwin in April 1945, before proceeding to Jacquinot Bay and then Biak as part of its redeployment to undertake further combat operations. Meanwhile, the 20th Motor Regiment returned to Australia on 4 July 1945 when the command of the Merauke region was handed over to the Dutch authorities.

== See also ==
- Naval Base Merauke
