= 3rd Motor Brigade (Australia) =

Motorised brigade of the Australian Army

- Active: 1921–1944
- Country: Australia
- Allegiance: Australian Crown
- Branch: Australian Army
- Type: Motor
- Size: Brigade
- Part of: 2nd Cavalry Division; 2nd Australian Motor Division; 1st Armoured Division; 2nd Infantry Division; III Corps

Insignia
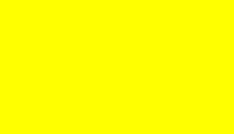
- Colour Patch

The 3rd Motor Brigade was a formation of the Australian Army during the interwar years and early part of World War II. Initially raised in 1921 as the 3rd Cavalry Brigade in Victoria, it was a formation of the part-time Militia. It consisted of three light horse regiments, which were spread across several depots in regional Victoria. During World War II, the brigade was mobilised for defensive duties in December 1941 to defend against a possible invasion. In early 1942, it was converted into a motorised formation and was redesignated as the 3rd Motor Brigade. The brigade moved to Western Australia in late 1942 and remained there until August 1944 when it was disbanded without having seen combat.

== History ==
Headquartered in Melbourne, the brigade was formed in 1921 as the 3rd Cavalry Brigade, with depots across Victoria. A formation of the part-time Militia, it consisted of three light horse regiments: the 8th, 13th, and 20th. These regiments were based in Benalla, Warragul and Seymour, occupying part of the area previously assigned to the disbanded 5th and 6th Light Horse Brigades. By 1938, the brigade had been expanded to include the 4/19th, 8th, 13th, 20th and 17th (MG) Light Horse Regiments, and formed part of the 2nd Australian Cavalry Division.

During the early part of World War II, the brigade was mobilised in December 1941 following Japan's entry into the war. Concentrating around Winchelsea, the brigade's constituent units were deployed to defend possible approaches to Geelong to respond in the event of an invasion. To achieve this, the 23rd/21st Infantry Battalion was deployed to Ocean Grove, the 8th Reconnaissance Battalion, was based at Mount Duneed, and the 26th Light Horse (Machine Gun) Regiment occupied the Belmont Recreation Reserve. From these positions, the brigade was tasked with linking in with two other forces – Corangamite Force and Torquay Force – which were to form a screen to the brigade's south and west. At the end of December 1941, brigade headquarters moved to the Geelong Racecourse.

The brigade was relieved of its forward role in early 1942 when the 4th Infantry Division arrived. The 3rd Cavalry Brigade subsequently lost the 23rd/21st Infantry Battalion, and was moved into reserve positions around Lysterfield, assuming command of the 4th Light Horse, 26th Light Horse (Machine Gun) Regiment and the 1st Armoured Car Regiment. This was the first part of a reorganisation that saw the brigade being converted into the 3rd Australian Motor Brigade in March 1942, which was undertaken as part of an effort to motorise or mechanise Australia's mounted forces in the early war years. Following its motorisation, the brigade consisted of the 4th, 26th and 101st Motor Regiments. By June, the brigade had redeployed to Rowville, but this was followed by another move to Seymour in September 1942.

At this time, the brigade was assigned to the 2nd Australian Motor Division in September 1942; however, in October it was re-assigned to 1st Armoured Division, which was being deployed to Western Australia as part of III Corps. The brigade's move was completed by November, with the 3rd Motor Brigade assuming positions around Mullewa. While waiting for the rest of the 1st Armoured Division to arrive, the brigade was placed into a corps reserve role, during which time they were tasked with providing manoeuvre support to several infantry brigades that were deployed between Geraldton and Strawberry, and also providing a reconnaissance capability to the north of the Northampton–Yalgoo. In March 1943, the brigade moved to Mingenew to take part in divisional training. A further move then took place in July to Dandaragan. The 1st Armoured Division was disbanded in September 1943, as part of efforts to reallocate manpower to operational units, and from then the 3rd Motor Brigade was attached to the 2nd Infantry Division. After training to prepare for combined operations, the brigade came under direct command of III Corps from April 1944, when the 2nd Infantry Division was broken up and ceased to exist. Finally, the 3rd Motor Brigade was disbanded at Chidlow, in August 1944.

As a motorised formation, the brigade was initially commanded by Brigadier Kenneth McKenzie, until March 1943 when Brigadier Frank Wells took over. In June 1943, Brigadier John Clarebrough assumed command, remaining in the position until the brigade was disbanded.

== Brigade units ==
All units that served with the brigade as a cavalry formation during the war:

- 4th Light Horse
- 8th Light Horse
- 4th/19th Light Horse
- 17th Light Horse (Machine Gun)
- 20th Light Horse
- 13th Light Horse
- 26th Light Horse (Machine Gun)
- 8th Reconnaissance Regiment
- 1st Armoured Regiment

The following units served with the brigade as a motorised formation during the war:

- 4th Motor Regiment
- 26th Motor Regiment
- 101st Motor Regiment
- 25th Cavalry Regiment

== See also ==
- List of Australian Army brigades
