= 4th/19th Prince of Wales's Light Horse =

Australian Army unit

4th/19th Prince of Wales's Light Horse Regiment
- Cap badge of the 4th/19th Prince of Wales's Light Horse
- Active: 1948 – present
- Country: Australia
- Branch: Army Reserve
- Type: Light horse
- Role: Light cavalry
- Size: One regiment
- Part of: 4th Brigade
- Garrison/HQ: Simpson Barracks
- Motto: Ich Dien (I Serve)
- Colours: Red, white
- March: Australian Light Horse
- Engagements: Vietnam War

Commanders
- Current commander: Lieutenant Colonel Duncan Hains
- Colonel-in-Chief: King Charles III (Colonel-in-Chief, RAAC)

Insignia
- Unit colour patch

The 4th/19th Prince of Wales's Light Horse (4/19 PWLH) is a cavalry regiment of the Australian Army. The regiment in its current composition was formed in 1948, when the Citizens Military Force (CMF) was re-raised after the completion of the demobilisation process following the end of the Second World War, through the amalgamation of three previously existing regiments. Through these predecessor units, 4/19 PWLH can trace its lineage back to the 19th century and today it is the custodian of the battle honours earned by these units. The regiment had a Regular squadron, 1 Troop 4th/19th Prince of Wales Light Horse Regiment, which was posted to South Vietnam in 1965 where it was attached to 1 RAR operating out of Bien Hoa Province. It returned to Australia on 28 May 1966 and became part of the Regular cavalry units that continue to exist in the Australian Army today. These units subsequently served during the Vietnam War and many of their personnel continued to wear regimental accoutrements while in South Vietnam.

Today 4/19 Prince of Wales Light Horse Regiment is an Australian Army Reserve regiment and forms part of the 4th Brigade, 2nd Division based in Victoria. As part of the restructure of the Royal Australian Armoured Corps (RAAC) units of the Australian Army Reserve it is now equipped with Bushmaster Protected Mobility Vehicles.

== History ==
=== 1948–2005 ===
The regiment was formed in 1948 as the 4th/19th Armoured Regiment (Prince of Wales's Light Horse) as a unit of the Citizens Military Force through the amalgamation of three other regiments: the 4th (Corangamite) Light Horse, the 17th (Prince of Wales's) Light Horse, and the 19th Light Horse (Yarrowee Light Horse). Through these, the regiment can trace its lineage through many units, including: the Kyneton District Mounted Rifle Corps, the Royal Volunteer Cavalry Regiment, the 17th Light Horse, the 17th Prince of Wales Light Horse, the 19th Yarrowee Light Horse, the 20th Corangamite Light Horse, the 4th Corangamite Light Horse, the 4th Light Horse AIF, and the 2/4th Armoured Regiment.

The record of the 4th Light Horse in the 1914–18 war is without equal in the Australian Imperial Force. It was the only Australian unit to see service on all three fronts, Western Front (France), Gallipoli and Palestine and was granted a total of 24 Battle Honours of which 10 are carried on the guidon. Probably the most notable action of the 4th Light Horse was as part of the 4th Light Horse Brigade, the charge at the Battle of Beersheba on 31 October 1917, where 800 Australian lighthorsemen took the town and crucial wells of Beersheba. This action is commemorated each year by the serving soldiers of the regiment.

The regiment assumed its present name in 1949. It was initially a part of the 2nd Armoured Brigade and was equipped with General Grant Tanks. there were squadrons at Coburg, Ararat, Colac, Horsham and Warrnambool. in 1952, a re-organisation took place and the squadrons were located at Coburg, Seymour and Wangaratta. Later the regiment was concentrated in the Melbourne Area and begun to train with Centurion tanks.

When National Service Training was abolished in 1958 the Army re-organised on the Pentropic Divisional Establishment. The regiment retained its title and locale but its role was changed to that of a Reconnaissance Regiment equipped with light-skinned vehicles (Ferret Scout Cars, Saracen APC's and Staghound Armoured Cars). It was also assigned the CMF depots at Sale and Bairnsdale which had previously been used by 8th/13th Victorian Mounted Rifles. Later, in 1965, the regiment added the former gunners at Traralgon to its Country Squadron.

In 1960, a regular squadron, A Squadron, was added to the regiment. In 1965, this was removed from the regiment's order of battle—Number 1 Troop was used as the nucleus in the formation of 1st Armoured Personnel Carrier Troop during its deployment to Vietnam, while the rest of the squadron was used to form 2nd Cavalry Regiment. Later, 1 APC Sqn would be used to form the 3rd Cavalry Regiment. In the early 1970s, the regiment was equipped with M113A1 APCs. The regiment at this stage consisted of RHQ, a sabre squadron (B) in Melbourne and a sabre squadron (C, later A) in Sale, Traralgon and Bairnsdale. Both Sabre squadrons and reconnaissance and, later, cavalry roles. For a time in the early 1970s, B Squadron trained as an APC squadron.

The latter years of the 20th century for the regiment were a time of depot closures and relocations. Many of the old drill halls were sold off by Defence as a part of a program of upgrading accommodation and locating units more appropriately. The unit vacated country depots at Traralgon, Bairnsdale, Kyneton and Sale. After the Sale squadron moved to the new quarters which it currently operates out of at RAAF Base East Sale the old drill hall was acquired by the local council and is now a regional military museum.

In 1992, 4th/19th Prince of Wales's Light Horse Regiment underwent another major restructure when it was linked with Victoria's second Armoured Reserve Unit, the 8th/13th Victorian Mounted Rifles (8th/13th VMR). Before this restructure, 8th/13th VMR had its HQ and 1 Troop based in Albury, 2 Troop based in Wangaratta and 3 Troop based in Benalla. After the linking, 8/13th VMR became 'A' Squadron, 4/19th PWLH.

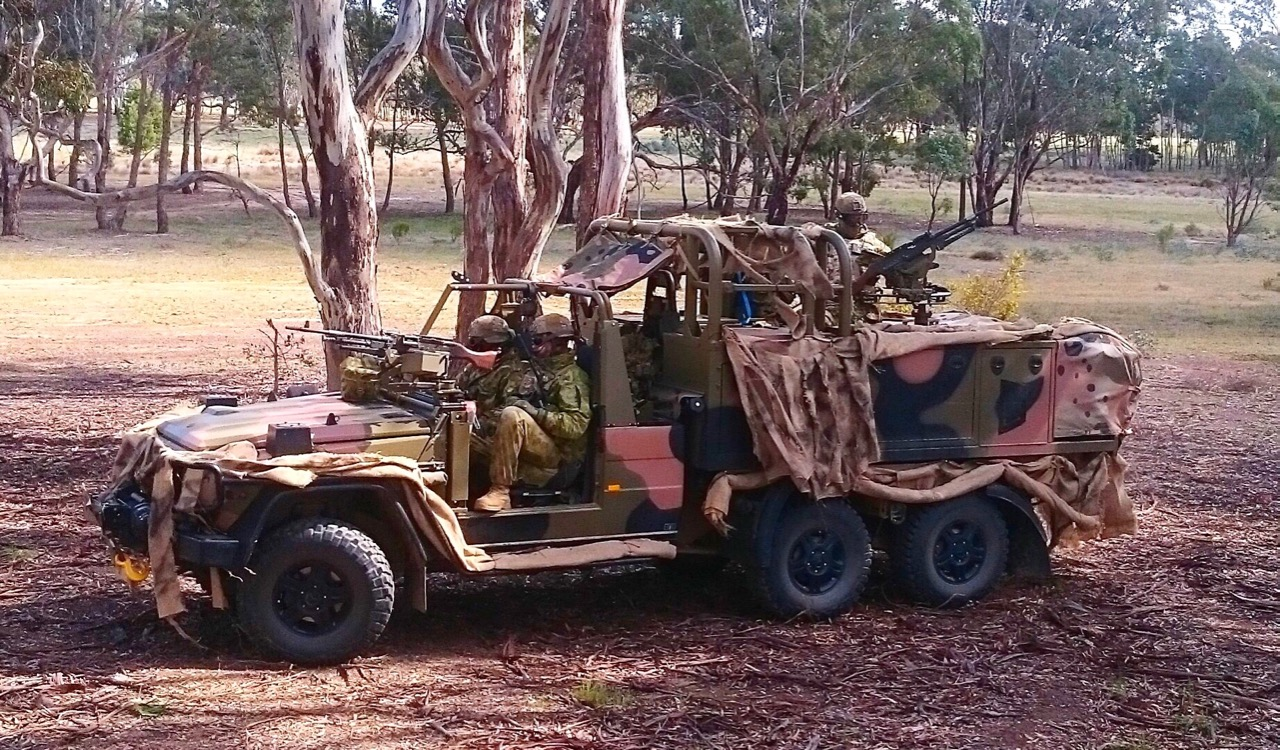
Mercedes Benz G-Wagon SRV on exercise with the 4th/19th Prince of Wales's Light Horse

=== 2006–present ===
In 2006, the regiment was directed to re-role as Light Cavalry and provide individual and collective reinforcements to Army's cavalry forces. The M113A1 fleet was withdrawn and replaced by Land Rover 4x4 and six-wheeled based patrol vehicles. During this period a combined troop of light horsemen volunteered for continuous full-time service to reinforce 2nd/14th LHR. Many deployed to the Middle East Area of Operations for service in Afghanistan or Iraq throughout 2007–2008. Members of this regiment also participated in the Combined Task Force 13 (CTF 13) rotation to Operation Anode in the Solomon Islands in 2007. CTF 13 was commanded by Lieutenant Colonel Ian Upjohn (former CO in 2005–2006).

Today, the regiment maintains two Sabre squadrons: 'A' Squadron, which is based in Sale and Bandiana, and 'B' Squadron, which is located in Melbourne. On 28 April 2008, a Lance Guard consisting of members of 4/19 PWLH and 12/16 HRL was involved in the dedication of the Park of the Australian Soldier in Beersheba, Israel. The park includes a bronze statue of a lighthorseman involved in the Charge of Beersheba on 31 October 1917. This event was the first time the regiment's guidon has travelled overseas. The regiment has been granted the Freedom of Entry to five cities: Melbourne, Kyneton, Beechworth, Traralgon and Sale.

From 2007 to present the regiment went through a number of iterations of both vehicles and directed outcomes. Following the change to Land Rover and Interim Infantry Mobility Vehicle (IIMV), the unit was at the forefront of the implementation of the Mercedes Benz G-Wagon as the Land Rover replacement, conducting an extended trial of the six-wheeled surveillance and reconnaissance vehicle (SRV) variant in 2013 and 2014.

From 2013 the regiment commenced a transition from Land Rover and IIMV to the Bushmaster Protected Mobility Vehicle (PMV). The PMV has been used extensively on operations by the ADF and has saved countless lives of service personnel. With the enactment of Plan Beersheeba, the unit was partnered with the 1st Brigade and along with the 3rd/9th South Australian Mounted Rifles the Regiment was tasked to provide PMV lift and cavalry effect to the reinforcing battlegroup.

=== Recent operational service ===
In addition to dealing with all the changing vehicle types and directed outcomes, with the associated training liabilities, the regiment was able to provide regular support to operations. During this time members of 4th/19th PWLH deployed on the following operations:

- OP ANODE in 2009, 2012 and 2013
- OP SLIPPER in 2013
- OP OKRA in 2016
- OP RESOLUTE on TSE rotations ever since to the present date.

As a Reserve unit the regiment was called upon to provide assistance in a variety of taskings for both OP Bushfire Assist as well as Operation Covid Assist.

== Battle honours ==
The consolidated list of the regiment's battle honours are listed below. Those honours that are displayed on 4th/19th PWLH Guidon are as follows:

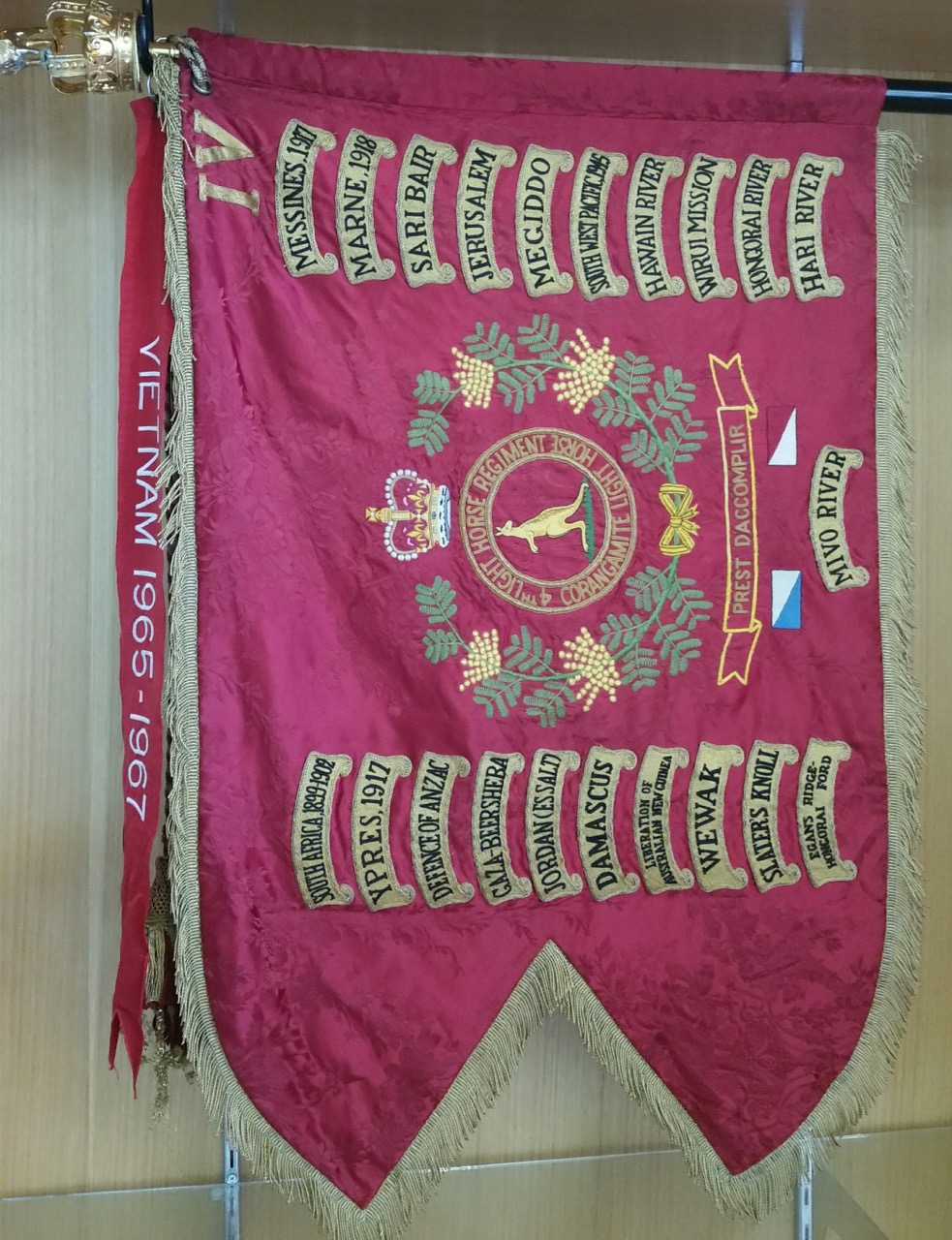
Unit Guidon showing the battle honours of the 4th Light Horse Regiment

- South Africa 1899–1902
- Gallipoli 1915
- Messines 1915
- Ypres 1917
- Amiens
- France and Flanders 1916–1918
- Egypt 1915–1917
- Gaza – Beersheeba
- Jerusalem
- Damascus
- Palestine 1917–1918
- Liberation of Australia New Guinea
- Hawain River
- Wewak
- Wirui Mission
- Slater's Knoll
- Hongorai River
- Egan's Ridge Hongorai Ford
- Hari River
- Mivo River
- US Citation Streamer Vietnam 1965–1967

Battle honours not displayed on Guidon:

- ANZAC
- Defence of ANZAC
- Suvla
- Sari Bair
- EL Mughar
- Nebi Samwil
- Jordan (Es Salt)
- Megiddo
- Sharon
- Broodseinde
- Passchendaele
- Lys
- Kemmel
- Marne 1918
- Tardenois
- Somme 1916–1918
- Pozieres
- Bapaume 1917
- Arras 1917
- Albert
- Romani
- Magdhaba-Rafa
- South West Pacific 1943–1944
- South West Pacific 1945
- Kirui Mission

== Alliances ==
- United Kingdom – The Royal Dragoon Guards
- United Kingdom – The Queen's Royal Hussars (Queen's Own and Royal Irish)
- United Kingdom – The King's Royal Hussars

== See also ==
- Military history of Australia
