= 22nd Field Regiment, Royal Australian Artillery =

Australian Army artillery unit

22nd Field Regiment
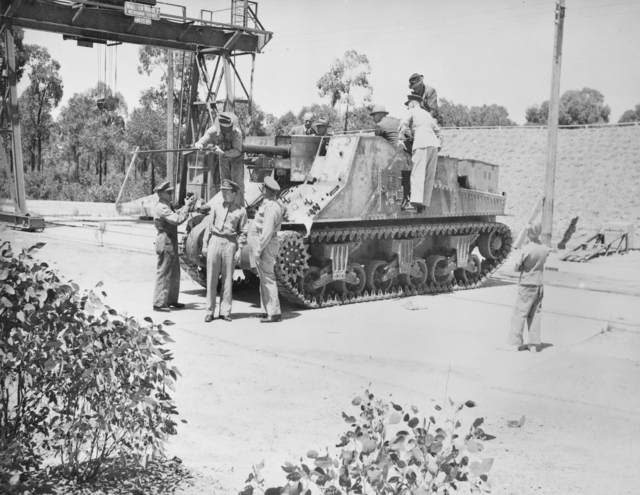
- A 22nd Field Regiment Yeramba self propelled artillery vehicle, 1949
- Active: 1916–1957
- Country: Australia
- Branch: Army
- Type: Artillery
- Role: Self propelled artillery (1948–1957)
- Size: 3 artillery batteries
- Part of: 2nd Division; 2nd Cavalry Division; 2nd Armoured Brigade

Insignia
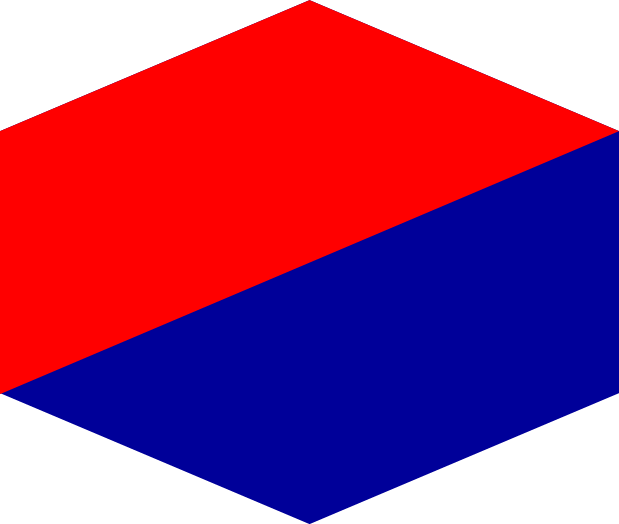
- Unit colour patch 1943–1944

The 22nd Field Regiment, Royal Australian Artillery was an artillery regiment of the Australian Army. Formed in 1916 as a howitzer brigade assigned to the 2nd Division, the unit served on the Western Front during World War I until it was disbanded in early 1917. In 1921, it was raised as a part-time unit in Victoria. It undertook defensive duties in Australia during World War II and in the late 1940s and into the mid-1950s the regiment served as a self propelled artillery unit assigned to the 2nd Armoured Brigade. It was disbanded in 1957.

== History ==
The regiment was formed as the 22nd Howitzer Brigade in Egypt during World War I. Raised in February 1916 as part the Australian Imperial Force, in April 1916 it was renamed the 22nd Field Artillery Brigade and served on the Western Front with the 2nd Division. The brigade consisted of three batteries at this time: the 19th, 20th and 21st. Throughout the second half of 1916, the brigade supported the 2nd Division, initially around Armentieres, and at Pozieres, on Somme and in Flanders. It was disbanded in January 1917 when the decision was made to consolidate the number of guns within each battery and reduce the number of artillery brigades in each division.

In 1921, after the AIF was demobilised, Australia's part-time military forces were reorganised. At this time, the 22nd Field Brigade was raised as a part-time Militia unit, based at Richmond, Victoria. It was assigned to the 2nd Cavalry Division.

During World War II, the regiment was re-designated as the 22nd Field Regiment in February 1941, consisting of the 40th and 44th Field Batteries. It undertook defensive duties in Victoria as part of the 2nd Cavalry Division and then later the 3rd Motor Brigade when the cavalry division was converted into a motorised formation. A third battery – the 58th Field Battery – was also raised in March 1942. This battery was disbanded, though, when the 48th Field Battery arrived from Adelaide in June 1942, although the 58th was re-raised in November while the regiment was at Seymour, Victoria, when the 48th became a depot battery at the School of Artillery when the 2nd Motor Division was converted into an armoured formation.

In early 1943, the regiment (less the 44th Field Battery which went to the School of Artillery at Holsworthy) was transferred to the 3rd Armoured Division in Queensland. Moving to Gympie, the regiment was assigned to the 1st Motor Brigade until that formation was disbanded as part of a contraction in the size of the Australian Army. The regiment was subsequently amalgamated with the 21st Field Regiment in July 1943. The amalgamated unit was itself disbanded in October 1943.

In the post war period, the regiment was part of the 3rd Division, and was assigned to support the 2nd Armoured Brigade in 1948. Headquartered at Brighton, Victoria, this unit was equipped with the unique Yeramba self propelled artillery piece. When the 2nd Armoured Brigade was disbanded in 1957, the regiment ceased to exist.
