= 2/4th Armoured Regiment (Australia) =

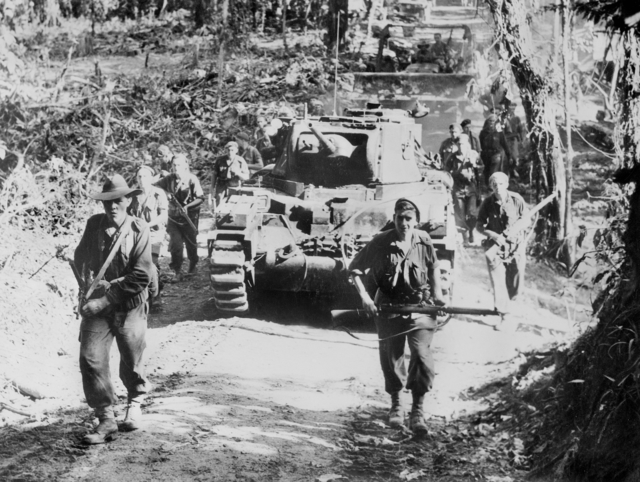
- A 2/4th Armoured Regiment Matilda II advancing with Australian infantry on Bougainville in March 1945
- Active: 1942–1946
- Country: Australia
- Branch: Australian Army
- Type: Armoured
- Part of: 3rd Armoured Division, 4th Armoured Brigade
- Equipment: M3 Stuart, M3 Grant and Matilda II tanks
- Engagements: World War II: Aitape-Wewak campaign; Bougainville Campaign

The 2/4th Armoured Regiment was an armoured regiment of the Australian Army, which served during World War II. The regiment was formed in November 1942 as part of the Second Australian Imperial Force by amalgamating a number of previously existing armoured units and was disbanded in September 1946 after seeing action in New Guinea and Bougainville Island, where it provided individual squadron-group sized elements which operated in support of infantry operations against the Japanese. During its service the regiment received 10 battle honours.

== History ==
The 2/4th Armoured Regiment was one of the last armoured units raised by the Australian Army during the war, being formed in order to replace the 2/6th Armoured Regiment which had been detached from the 1st Armoured Division to serve in New Guinea. Under the command of Lieutenant Colonel D.A Cameron, the regiment was raised in November 1942 from elements of a number of Australian armoured reconnaissance units, including 'D' Squadron of the 2/11th Armoured Car Regiment and the 2/1st and 2/2nd Light Tank Squadrons, and was concentrated at Wee Waa, New South Wales. Initially, the regiment formed part of the 2nd Armoured Brigade of the 3rd Armoured Division and was equipped with M3 Grant medium tanks and M3 Stuart light tanks.

At the beginning of 1943, the regiment was relocated to Manumbah in Queensland, travelling over 350 miles (560 km) from Narabri to their final destination near Murgon. The move north was punctuated by heavy rain that turned the road into a quagmire that was meant that at times the tank transporters had to be towed by the tanks that they were supposed to be transporting. Upon reaching their destination they commenced training and would remain in Queensland for the best part of a year. In October 1943, however, the 3rd Armoured Division was disbanded and the 2/4th was allocated to the 4th Armoured Brigade, an independent armoured brigade, and was re-equipped with Matilda II tank which were better suited for jungle warfare than the Grant and Stuart tanks.

In August 1944, after training at Southport on the Gold Coast, the regiment received orders to deploy overseas and was moved to Madang in New Guinea, where it replaced the 1st Tank Battalion. Deployed to provide support to the Australian Army infantry units fighting the Japanese, the regiment provided a number of elements—organised into squadron-group sized elements each with its own support units—to different infantry formations and the first element of the regiment to see action was the 'C' Squadron Group which was attached the 6th Division during the Aitape–Wewak campaign from November 1944; in doing so, they took part in the advance towards Wewak, the capture of Niap in January 1945 followed by the capture of Wewak in May. In April, the tanks moved to the town of But in April and from there, the squadron's tanks supported further actions along the Hawain River and around the Wirui Mission. By the end of the war they had occupied Boram.

Elsewhere, in December 1944, the 'B' Squadron Group was sent to Bougainville Island to support the Australian II Corps during the Bougainville Campaign. This squadron first saw action on 31 March 1945, when it played an important role in supporting the 3rd Division during the Battle of Slater's Knoll. The Regimental Headquarters and the 'A' Squadron Group were also sent to Bougainville in May 1945 and the regiment continued to provide support to the Australian infantry until the Japanese surrender taking part in a number of battles during the advance towards Buin in the southern sector, including the fighting around the Hongorai River and the crossings of the Hari and Mivo Rivers. In July, a troop-sized detachment was allocated to the 23rd Brigade which was fighting along the Ratsua front in the northern sector of the island in the Bonis Peninsula.

Following the end of the war a detachment from the regiment was deployed to Rabaul to assist with guarding the 100,000 Japanese troops in the region. As the regiment's numbers were gradually reduced due to the demobilisation process, the 2/4th Armoured Regiment returned to Australia in May 1946 and was finally disbanded in September 1946. During the course of the unit's war service it suffered 25 men killed in action or died on active service and 31 wounded. Members of the 2/4th received the following decorations: one Distinguished Service Order, three Military Crosses, two Orders of the British Empire, three Military Medal and seven Mentioned in Despatches.

== Commanding officers ==
The following officers commanded the 2/4th during the war:

- Lieutenant Colonel Donald Allen Cameron (November 1942 – December 1942)
- Lieutenant Colonel Arnold Jack Caddy (December 1942 – May 1944)
- Lieutenant Colonel Tom Mills (May 1944 – September 1946)

== Battle honours ==
The 2/4th Armoured Regiment received 10 battle honours for its service during World War II, these were:

- South-West Pacific 1945, Liberation of Australian New Guinea, Hawain River, Wewak, Wirui Mission, Slater's Knoll, Hongorai River, Egan's Ridge–Hongorai Ford, Hari River, Mivo River.
