= 2nd Armoured Brigade (Australia) =

1941–1957 formation of the Australian Army

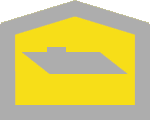
- HQ 2nd Armoured Brigade Colour Patch
- Active: 1941–1944; 1948–1957
- Country: Australia
- Allegiance: Australian Crown
- Branch: Australian Army
- Type: Armoured
- Size: Brigade
- Part of: 1st Armoured Division (1941–1942); 3rd Armoured Division (1942–1943); First Army (1943–1944); Southern Command (1948–1957)
- Equipment: Tank

Commanders
- Notable commanders: William Locke; Maurice Fergusson; David Whitehead

The 2nd Armoured Brigade was a formation of the Australian Army during World War II. The brigade was formed in July 1941, at Puckapunyal, Victoria, from Second Australian Imperial Force volunteers. It was assigned to the 1st Armoured Division in July 1941, with the intention of deploying it to the Middle East. However, it was reassigned to home defence following Japan's entry into the war, and was then transferred to the 3rd Armoured Division in October 1942. The brigade remained in Australia, undertaking defensive duties in Victoria and Queensland before being disbanded in January 1944. While it did not see any active service as a formation, some of its constituent units eventually took part in the campaigns on Tarakan, Labuan, Bougainville and around Aitape–Wewak in 1944–1945 after transferring to other brigades.

It was re-raised in the postwar period, serving as a part-time Citizens Military Force formation between 1948 and 1957. During this period, the 2nd Armoured Brigade was based in Victoria and formed part of Southern Command. Its headquarters was broken up when the Australian Army determined that there was no need for large scale armoured formations as the focus shifted to jungle operations and close infantry-armoured cooperation. Its constituent units were subsequently dispersed to other formations.

== History ==
=== World War II ===
In June 1940, the Australian government decided to form an armoured division consisting of six armoured regiments (under two brigade headquarters) within the all-volunteer Second Australian Imperial Force (2nd AIF) for deployment to the Middle East. This was by far the largest armoured unit the Australian Army had established, with interwar experimentation being limited to a single armoured car regiment. The armoured division was deemed necessary to enable the formation of a self-contained Australian corps along with the four infantry divisions that had been formed. As a result, the 2nd Armoured Brigade was formed at Puckapunyal, Victoria, in July 1941. As an element of the 2nd AIF, it formed part of the 1st Armoured Division and on establishment, the brigade was assigned three armoured regiments; each regiment had an authorised strength of 10 scout cars, 46 cruiser tanks and 6 support tanks. The assigned regiments were the 2/8th, 2/9th and 2/10th. These regiments had been formed separately in Victoria (2/8th), South Australia and Tasmania (2/9th), and Western Australia (2/10th). Following individual training, the regiments moved to Puckapunyal to join the brigade headquarters in November 1941. The following month, elements of the brigade were detached to form the 2/2nd Independent Light Tank Squadron, which was to be sent to Malaya to fight the Japanese; however, this deployment was cancelled following the fall of Singapore, and the personnel were returned to the brigade. At this time, they were formed into the 2/2nd Armoured Brigade Reconnaissance Squadron.

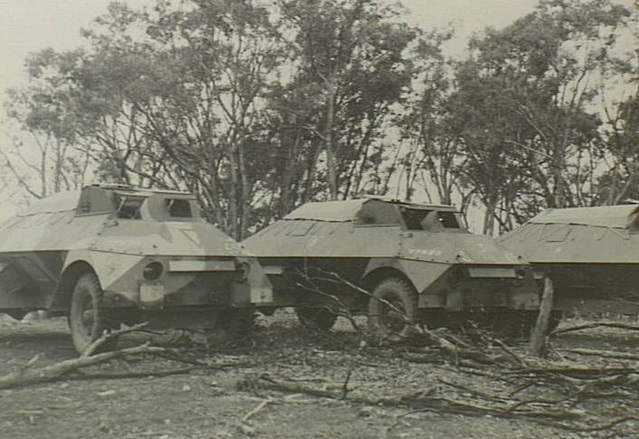
Rover armoured cars from the 2nd Armoured Brigade at Puckapunyal, June 1942

It had initially been planned to raise a new 2nd AIF infantry battalion – the 2/37th – as a motorised unit, but instead it was decided to utilise the already existing Militia light horse units as motor regiments. As a result, the 20th Motor Regiment joined the brigade. The brigade's first commander was Brigadier William Locke, a regular Army officer who had served in the infantry during World War I. Locke served as commander of the brigade until January 1942 when Brigadier John Clarebrough assumed command. It had been planned that the brigade would deploy to the Middle East in early 1942, where the British had offered to provide the necessary equipment to bring the formation up to establishment; however, Japan's entry into the war in December 1941 meant that this was cancelled and instead the brigade was reallocated to the defence of Australia in the case of an invasion. The delivery of tanks to the brigade was slow, and for a period elements of the brigade were equipped with machine gun carriers instead. More tanks – specifically US-made M3 Grant medium tanks and Stuart light tanks – arrived throughout the first half of 1942. Brigadier Maurice Fergusson took command of the brigade in April 1942, and would remain in command of the formation until its disbandment.

In July 1942, the 2nd Armoured Brigade moved to Greta, New South Wales, and then Wee Waa as the 1st Armoured Division was concentrated before divisional exercises were undertaken in August 1942 around Narrabri. In October 1942, the 1st Armoured Division was reorganised to provide some of its more experienced elements to help raise the 2nd and 3rd Armoured Divisions. At this time, the 2nd Armoured Brigade was reassigned to the 3rd Armoured Division, and tasked with securing an area around Murgon, Queensland. A preliminary move was undertaken to Narrabri, and around this time the 20th Motor Regiment was transferred from the brigade to the join the 2nd Armoured Division, which was to remain in Victoria. The brigade also lost the 2/10th Armoured Regiment, which was transferred to the 1st Armoured Brigade in Western Australia, replacing the 2/6th Armoured Regiment when it was deployed to New Guinea. Meanwhile, the 2/10th was replaced in the 2nd Armoured Brigade by the newly raised 2/4th Armoured Regiment, which had been formed from troops drawn from the two AIF armoured brigade reconnaissance squadrons. By January 1943, the brigade had moved to Gobongo.

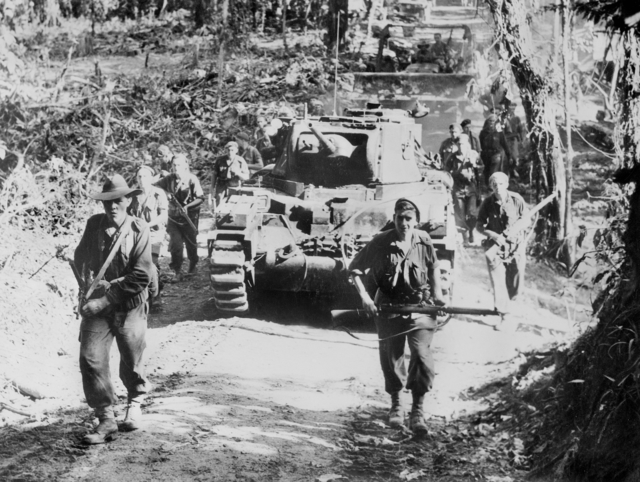
Former elements of the 2nd Armoured Brigade in action on Bougainville, March 1945.

As the tide of war in the Pacific turned in favour of the Allies in 1943, the threat of invasion passed. The Australian government decided to reallocate some of the manpower that had been tied up in the armoured divisions to other formations that would be utilised for jungle warfare, or civilian industry. As a result, throughout 1943, although the brigade remained assigned to the 3rd Armoured Division in Queensland, its composition changed frequently as a number of armoured and motorised units were assigned to it when they were rotated through Queensland or were disbanded. Over time, the AIF armoured regiments were replaced largely by Militia units. The 2/9th Armoured was transferred to the 4th Armoured Brigade in February 1943, and the 13th Armoured Regiment was sent to replace it. The 20th Motor Regiment was reassigned to the brigade around this time following the decision to disband the 2nd Armoured Division. In April, the 2/8th Armoured Regiment was deployed to New Guinea to relieve the 2/6th, which had taken heavy casualties during the Battle of Buna–Gona. The 2/8th, however, was ultimately confined to a static defensive and training role and did not see any combat. In its stead, the 21st Cavalry Regiment was assigned, being transferred from II Corps, although this regiment was broken up in May 1943 to provide divisional carrier companies for several infantry divisions. Further changes occurred when the 8th Cavalry Regiment arrived from First Army; however, the 8th Cavalry Regiment remained only until July 1943 when it was deployed to the Northern Territory. It was replaced in the brigade by the 2/6th Cavalry Regiment which arrived in August. In October, the 3rd Armoured Division's headquarters was reduced and the 2nd Armoured Brigade became a direct command unit of the First Army.

Finally, in January 1944, the 2nd Armoured Brigade was disbanded, having never seen active service overseas. Many of its constituent units – the 13th Armoured Regiment, 12th Armoured Car Regiment and 21st/22nd Field Regiment – were also disbanded at this time, while others such as the 2/6th Cavalry Regiment and 2/4th Armoured Regiments, both 2nd AIF units, were transferred for further service with the 6th Division and 4th Armoured Brigade, seeing action on Bougainville and around Aitape–Wewak in 1944–1945. The previously assigned 2/9th Armoured Regiment also saw action after its transfer from the 2nd Armoured Brigade, taking part in the fighting on Tarakan and Labuan in 1945. The 20th Motor Regiment also subsequently served with the 11th Brigade, forming part of Merauke Force, undertaking defensive duties in a dismounted role in Dutch New Guinea.

=== Postwar ===
In the postwar period, the Australian Army re-raised two armoured brigades – the 1st and the 2nd – in April 1948 within the part-time Citizens Military Force. The 2nd Armoured Brigade was formed in Victoria as part of Southern Command, and was placed under the command of Brigadier David Whitehead, who had previously commanded the 26th Infantry Brigade during the war. At this time, the brigade consisted of two armoured regiments – the 8th/13th and 4th/19th. The two armoured regiments operated reconditioned M3 Grants in the post-war period. The 8th/13th had depots across Melbourne, Albury, Benalla, Wangaratta and Sale, while the 4th/19th was spread across regional western Victoria. The brigade was also provided with an artillery regiment, the 22nd Field Regiment, Royal Australian Artillery. Headquartered at Brighton, Victoria, this unit was equipped with the unique Yeramba self propelled artillery piece.

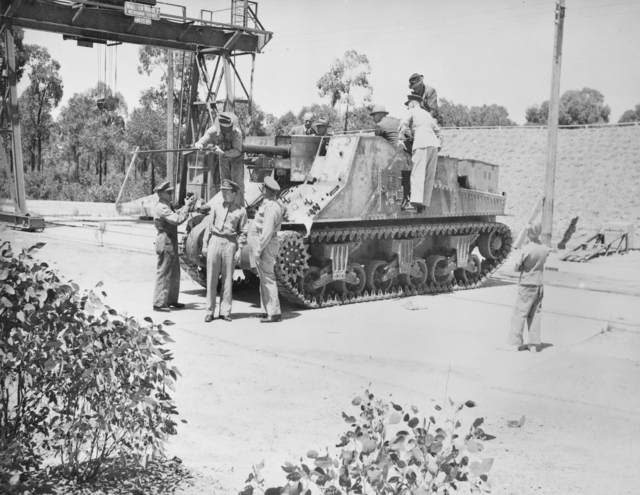
A Yeramba self propelled artillery vehicle, 1949

Throughout the early 1950s, the brigade's vehicles and equipment became obsolete and rundown and by the middle of the decade tank training was centralised at Puckapunyal with units rotating through the Armoured Centre. In 1953, Brigadier Heathcote Hammer took over command of the brigade, remaining in the position until 1956 when Brigadier Tom Fogarty, previously commander of the 8th/13th, replaced him. Around 1956, the brigade's armoured units began conversion training on the Centurion main battle tank; however, there were only a few vehicles available and this training had to be completed centrally at Puckapunyal. Training camps during this time were organised at squadron level, which out of necessity limited the outcomes with only basic tactical training being possible, in addition to individual, crew and specialist training.

The brigade ceased to exist in September 1957, following an Army wide reorganisation. This was based on a reassessment of the role of armour that resulted in a focus upon infantry support in jungle conditions rather than large-scale armoured warfare; as a result, it was considered that armoured brigade headquarters were no longer necessary. Nevertheless, some armoured headquarters staff were retained underneath the Brigadier, Royal Australian Armoured Corps cell that was established within both Southern and Eastern Commands at this time. This staff was intended to provide a cadre with which to form a brigade headquarters in an emergency, but it represented only about half of the 105 personnel that had previously undertaken the role, and it was abolished in 1960. Except for the 22nd Field Regiment, which was disbanded, the individual regiments previously assigned to the brigade remained on the order of battle under different formations and were finally re-equipped with Centurions around 1959, with the 8th/13th becoming a reconnaissance regiment, and the 4th/19th raising a squadron of Regular personnel. By 1960, with the introduction of the pentropic establishment, the 8th/13th was assigned to the 3rd Division's combat support group operating armoured personnel carriers and the 4th/19th was assigned to the 1st Division's combat support group in a reconnaissance role.

== Brigade units ==
The following units served with the brigade during the war:

- 2/8th Armoured Regiment
- 2/9th Armoured Regiment
- 2/10th Armoured Regiment
- 2/2nd Armoured Regiment Reconnaissance Squadron
- 2/4th Armoured Regiment
- 13th Armoured Regiment
- 20th Motor Regiment
- 21st Cavalry Regiment
- 8th Cavalry Regiment
- 12th Armoured Car Regiment
- 2/6th Cavalry Regiment
- 21st/22nd Field Regiment, Royal Australian Artillery

In the postwar period, the following units were assigned to the brigade:

- 8th/13th Armoured Regiment (Victorian Mounted Rifles)
- 4th/19th Prince of Wales's Light Horse
- 22nd Field Regiment, Royal Australian Artillery

== Commanders ==
The following officers commanded the 2nd Armoured Brigade:

- Brigadier WJM Locke (1941–1942)
- Brigadier JA Clarebrough (1942)
- Brigadier MA Fergusson (1942–1944)
- Brigadier DA Whitehead (1948–1953)
- Brigadier HH Hammer (1953–1956)
- Brigadier T Fogarty (1956–1957)

== See also ==
- List of Australian Army brigades
