= William Locke (general) =

Australian general

- Born: 14 August 1894; St Kilda, Victoria
- Died: 3 April 1962 (aged 67)
- Military career
- Allegiance: Australia
- Branch: Australian Army
- Service years: 1912–1947
- Rank: Major General
- Commands: 3rd Armoured Division (1943); 2nd Motor Division (1942–43); 2nd Cavalry Division (1942); 2nd Armoured Brigade (1941–42)
- Conflicts: First World War; Second World War
- Awards: Military Cross; Mentioned in Despatches (2)

Major General William James Macavoy Locke, MC (14 August 1894 – 3 April 1962) was a senior officer in the Australian Army during the Second World War and the immediate post-war period.

A graduate of the Royal Military College, Duntroon, Locke served in the First World War and spent much of the interwar period as a staff officer in Melbourne, Sydney and Tasmania. During the Second World War he commanded cavalry and armoured units at the brigade and division level, and was responsible for supervising the transition of many of Australia's mounted units to motorised and armoured formations. Locke finished his military career as Chairman of the Permanent Post-War Planning Committee (1944–1946).

Military offices
Preceded by Major General William Steele	General Officer Commanding 3rd Armoured Division; 1943	Succeeded by Major General William Bridgeford
