= 8th/13th Victorian Mounted Rifles =

- Active: 1948–92
- Country: Australia
- Branch: Australian Army Reserve
- Role: Armoured / reconnaissance
- Size: Regiment
- Part of: 2nd Armoured Brigade
- Garrison/HQ: Northern Victoria; Southern New South Wales
- Motto(s): Pro Rege Et Patria (Latin: "For My King and Country")

The 8th/13th Victorian Mounted Rifles (8th/13th VMR) was an armoured regiment of the Australian Army Reserve. Formed in 1948, the regiment initially operated M3 Grant medium tanks, but was later re-equipped with Centurion tanks in the late 1950s. Operating out of several depots across northern Victoria and southern New South Wales, throughout the 1950s, 60s and 70s the regiment undertook both an armoured and reconnaissance role operating both tanks and armoured cars before being re-equipped with M113A1 armored personnel carriers in the early 1970s. In 1976, the regiment was reduced to a squadron sized element. It was eventually merged with the 4th/19th Prince of Wales's Light Horse in 1992.

== History ==
Raised in May 1948 as part of the re-establishment of the Australia's part-time military force following the demobilisation of its wartime military, the 8th/13th was formed in the states of Victoria and New South Wales, as part of the 2nd Armoured Brigade, within the 3rd Military District. It was initially designated the "8th/13th Armoured Regiment (Victorian Mounted Rifles), but in 1949 it was renamed the "8th/13th Victorian Mounted Rifles".

The regiment drew its lineage from three previously existing light horse regiments – the 8th, 13th and 20th Light Horse Regiments – and through these linkages inherited battle honours from the Boer War, World War I and World War II. Through the 20th Light Horse, it was linked to the Victorian Mounted Rifles, which had been raised by Lieutenant Colonel Thomas Price in 1885.

Upon formation, the regiment's first commanding officer was Lieutenant Colonel Tom Fogarty, who had served with the 2/8th Armoured Regiment during the war. With depots at Albury, Wangaratta, Benalla, in the first years of its existence the regiment operated M3 Grant medium tanks, before converting to Centurions in 1957. 8th/13th VMR converted to a reconnaissance role in 1959, and took delivery of several scout car variants including Ferrets, Saracens, and Whites; nevertheless, it continued to operate a small number of Centurions into the early 1970s; but they were later re-roled and equipped with M113 armoured personnel carriers. In 1973, the depot at Cobram was added to the unit. In 1976, the 8th/13th VMR was reduced to a single independent squadron, before being merged with the 4th/19th Prince of Wales's Light Horse in 1991–92, forming a squadron element within that regiment.
