= 12th/16th Hunter River Lancers =

Australian Army Reserve unit

- Unit Badge of the 12th/16th Hunter River Lancers
- Active: 1948–present
- Country: Australia
- Branch: Army Reserve
- Type: Cavalry
- Role: Provide cavalry scouts and PMV drivers as roundouts and reinforcements in support of ADF operations.
- Size: One regiment
- Part of: 11th Brigade
- Garrison/HQ: Tamworth, New South Wales
- Motto(s): Virtutis Fortuna Comes (Fortune is the Companion of Valour)
- Colours: Black on blue
- March: Quick – Our Director

Insignia
- Unit colour patch
- Abbreviation: 12/16 HRL

The 12th/16th Hunter River Lancers is an Australian Army Reserve cavalry regiment. It was formed on 1 May 1948, although it draws its lineage from units that were originally formed in the 1880s. It is currently a Heavy Cavalry unit equipped with Bushmaster Protected Mobility Vehicles. The regiment forms part of the 11th Brigade, attached to the 2nd Division and draws its members from regional centres in northern New South Wales, hence the reference to the Hunter River. Since 2000 the regiment has provided individuals as reinforcements to round-out Regular Army units deploying overseas on peacekeeping operations and in the conflicts in Iraq and Afghanistan.

== History ==
=== Before World War I ===
The origins of the Hunter River Lancers can be traced back to 1885 when cavalry enthusiasts in Sydney first obtained permission to form a Cavalry troop. Interest soon stirred and shortly thereafter troops were formed in many country areas, one of which was in the Hunter River area. All these Cavalry troops were to some extent independent and were known as the 'Cavalry Reserves'. In 1889 these troops were welded into a Regiment called, 'New South Wales Cavalry Regiment', which was subsequently renamed the 'New South Wales Lancers' in 1894. In June 1897, a volunteer cavalry regiment of bushmen was raised and designated the 'Australian Horse'. Some of the sub units from this regiment were the forerunners of the New England Light Horse (NELH). In 1900, E Squadron was raised from Gunnedah, Boggabri, Tamworth and Armidale and rapidly mobilised a detachment to serve in the South African War.

After Federation in January 1901, the colonial military forces were reorganised. The 1st, 2nd and 3rd Australian Light Horse Regiments were formed in New South Wales at this time. In 1907, the 1st Australian Light Horse was split to form two regiments: the 1st and 4th, with the 4th assuming the designation of the Hunter River Lancers, while the 2nd Australian Light Horse was split to form the 2nd and 5th New South Wales Mounted Rifles, and the 3rd Australian Light Horse was split to form the 3rd and 6th Australian Horse. In 1912, the 6th Australian Horse became the 5th Light Horse (New England Light Horse), while the 4th Hunter River Lancers became 6th Light Horse (Hunter River Lancers). Each regiment received their own badges and mottoes and remained on the order of battle until 1918.

=== World War I ===
At the outbreak of World War I, new light horse regiments were formed as part of the Australian Imperial Force. Distinct from the Australian Military Forces regiments, they were raised specifically for overseas service. The 5th and 6th Regiments virtually ceased to exist as most of their available manpower joined the AIF.

The 12th Light Horse Regiment (AIF) was raised at Liverpool in early 1915 and was deployed as part of the 1st AIF to continue its training in Egypt. Most of its members were from the areas covered by both the 4th and 6th ALH. In July 1915 the regiment trained as infantry in preparation for deployment to Gallipoli. In late August 1915 the regiment departed Egypt to support the ANZAC forces at Gallipoli. Upon landing at Anzac Cove the regiment were split up to reinforce the three other Light Horse regiments from New South Wales (1st, 6th & 7th) already in place. Following the Gallipoli campaign, the regiment was redeployed to Egypt, where it took part in the Sinai campaign of 1916–1917 and the Palestine campaign of 1917–1918. In 1917 the regiment saw extensive service in Palestine where it took part in the Battle of Beersheba, the last great cavalry charge in modern warfare. Following this the regiment continued to be heavily involved in the Palestine campaign until the cessation of hostilities in October 1918.

=== Interwar and World War II ===
After the war, the designation of the pre-war regiments was altered to maintain the traditions and battle honours of the AIF Light Horse regiments. In 1918, the 5th Light Horse Regiment became the 12th Light Horse Regiment (New England Light Horse), and in 1927 was awarded the battle honours won by the 12th Light Horse Regiment (AIF). The 6th ALH (HRL) became the 16th Light Horse Regiment (Hunter River Lancers), and was awarded battle honours for the Middle East campaign, despite never having seen overseas service. This was because many of the members of the regiment had seen active service with other regiments.

In 1936, the 12th Light Horse regiment was designated the 12th/24th Light Horse Regiment and then in early 1939 the regiment was split to form the 12th Light Horse Regiment (New England Light Horse) and the 24th Light Horse Regiment (Gwydir Light Horse). The Gwydir Regiment had its headquarters at Moree.

With the outbreak of World War II, the 12th and the 16th were called up for one month's training and raised to their war establishment. In early 1940 both regiments attended a three-month training activity. Towards the end of 1941 the 12th and the 16th were placed on full-time duty with new designations – the 12th Light Horse Regiment (NELH), was now the 12th Motor Regiment (NELH) (effective 14 March 1942) and the 16th was renamed the 16th Light Horse (Machine Gun) Regiment (HRL) (effective December 1941). In 1942, the 12th Motor Regiment was re-designated as the 12th Australian Armoured Car Regiment (NELH). At the same time 16th Light Horse (Machine Gun) Regiment was re-designated the 16th Motor Regiment (HRL).

By 1942, the threat of Japanese invasion had passed and with island warfare not generally suited to armour, it was apparent three Australian armoured divisions, the 1st, 2nd and 3rd, would be disbanded. As a result, on 3 July 1943 the 16th Motor Regiment (HRL) was disbanded and the 12th Australian Armoured Car Regiment (NELH) followed on 19 October 1943, with the last men being marched out in March 1944. However, most of their soldiers from the 12th and 16th were posted to active service in other armoured, anti-tank, field artillery, infantry and service units of the Second Australian Imperial Force.

=== Postwar to current ===
In 1948, the 12th/16th Armoured Regiment (Hunter River Lancers) was raised as part of the new Citizen Military Force (CMF), which replaced the pre-war militia, and it was equipped with Matilda tanks, Staghound Armoured Cars and Canadian Scout Cars (known as "doodle bugs")—similar to the British Daimler Dingo but manufactured in Canada. The first regimental camp was held in February 1949 and the Regiment was the first CMF unit to go into camp. Regimental Headquarters and Headquarters Squadron was located at Muswellbrook with tank squadrons in Newcastle, Tamworth and Armidale.

The regiment was retitled 12th/16th Hunter River Lancers on 31 July 1949, forming part of the 1st Armoured Brigade. In the following years Regimental HQ was moved to Tamworth and the Regiment was re-roled in the reconnaissance role. The regiment was still equipped with Staghounds and Canadian Scout Cars (the Canadian Scout Cars were replaced by Ferret scout cars, in the late 1950s). In the 1960s the regiment was again reorganised, this time as an Armoured Personnel Carrier regiment equipped with Humber 4 × 4 trucks, Ferret scout cars, M3 Personnel Carriers and a solitary Saracen APC.

By 1970, the regiment was operating M113A1 APCs. In 1976, the regiment received M113A1 Medium Reconnaissance Vehicles and became a Medium Reconnaissance Regiment. 12/16 HRL reverted to the APC role in 1987, a role which it maintained until 2005 when it was announced that 12/16 HRL would become a Light Cavalry Regiment, and be equipped with new Bushmaster PMVs.

Since 2000 many members of the regiment have been attached to regular RAAC units and seen active service in East Timor, Solomon Islands, Iraq and Afghanistan. In September 2007, the regiment received 11 Bushmasters. From 1 January 2018 the regiment went through a number of organisational changes. It was removed from the 8th Brigade and came under the command of the 11th Brigade, Support Squadron in Tamworth was removed from the regiment's ORBAT and at the same time B Squadron was relocated from Muswellbrook in NSW to Caboolture in Queensland. However, no soldiers were involved in this move. All soldiers in the Tamworth, Armidale and Muswellbrook depots became members of A Squadron and the personnel of the new B Squadron were all sourced/recruited from the South-East Queensland region.

== Current organisation ==
The Regiment is currently organised as follows:

- Regimental Headquarters – Tamworth, NSW
- 'A' Squadron – Armidale, Muswellbrook, Tamworth, NSW
- 'B' Squadron – Caboolture, Greenbank, QLD.

== Alliances ==
- United Kingdom – The Royal Scots Dragoon Guards (Carabiniers and Greys)
- United Kingdom – The Queen's Royal Lancers - this alliance ceased sometime after 2015 (official date unknown) when the Queens Royal Lancers were amalgamated with the 9th/12th Royal Lancers (Prince of Wales's) on 2 May 2015 to form the Royal Lancers.
