= Yeramba =

Yeramba self-propelled 25 Pounder
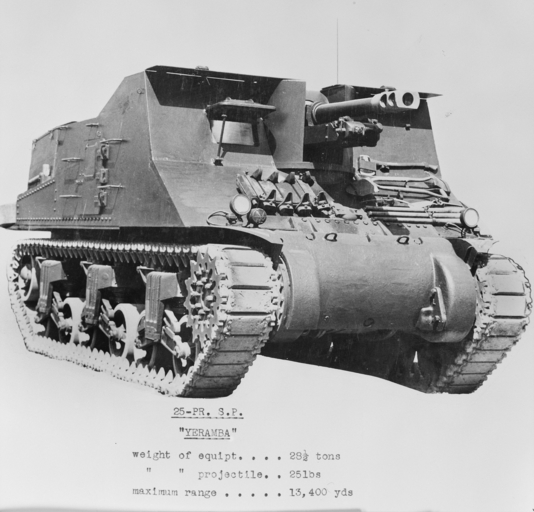
- The prototype Yeramba in 1949
- Type: Self-propelled artillery
- Place of origin: Australia

Service history
- In service: 1950–1957
- Used by: Australia

Production history
- Designed: 1949
- Produced: 1950–1952

Specifications
- Mass: 28.5 long tons (29.0 t)
- Length: 18 feet 11 inches (5.77 m)
- Width: 8 feet 11 inches (2.72 m)
- Height: 8 feet (2.4 m)
- Crew: 6 (Commander, Driver, and 4 gun crew)
- Armour: 1.5 inches (38 mm)
- Main armament: QF 25 pdr (87.6 mm) Mk II
- Secondary armament: Two 0.303 (7.7 mm) Bren light machine gun
- Engine: Twin GM 6-71 diesel 375 horsepower (280 kW)
- Power/weight: 13 hp/ton
- Suspension: Vertical Volute Spring
- Operational range: 125 miles (201 km)
- Maximum speed: 25 miles per hour (40 km/h)

The Yeramba was an Australian self-propelled howitzer built after the end of the Second World War in the late-1940s. They were produced by mounting the 25 pounder gun-howitzer on an American M3A5 Grant tank hull, and were converted by the Ordnance Factory in Bendigo from 1950 to 1952. The Yeramba was withdrawn from service in 1957 after becoming obsolete. The name is from the yeramba, an Aboriginal instrument for throwing spears.

== History ==
=== Development ===
The 1947 defence program witnessed the formation of the Australian Regular Army and included in the plans for a permanent field force was a number of new armoured formations—the 2nd Armoured Brigade Group among them. Allocated to this independent brigade was 22nd Field Regiment, Royal Australian Artillery. One of the lessons of the war in Europe had been the need for artillery units in armoured brigades to have the same mobility and protection as the tanks they were supporting, and consequently a program was begun to acquire a self-propelled gun.

However, as modern self-propelled artillery could not be purchased from overseas, it was decided to adapt a small number of M3 Grant tanks to the role. Although officially known as "Ordnance, Quick Firing, 25 pdr Mark 2/1, on Mounting Self propelled 25 pdr (AUST) Mark 1, on Carrier, Grant, Self Propelled 25 pdr (AUST) Mark 1", the name Warragal (Note: see wiktionary:Warragal for meanings) was proposed to replace this awkward nomenclature in general use. This was rejected, and in January 1951 the name 'SP 25 pounder Yeramba' was accepted as the official short name.

Drawings for the Canadian Sexton self-propelled 25 pounder—also derived from the M3 chassis—were obtained and adapted, with the turret and much of the frontal armour of the Grant replaced by an open-topped fighting compartment. The driver's position and controls were moved down and to the right within the vehicle. Indeed, a new welded, open-topped superstructure was added in place of the 37 mm (1.5 in) turret, forward hull, and sponson-mounted 75 mm (3 in) gun. A QF 25 pounder Mk 2/1 with a 20 in (510 mm) fixed length recoil system and a muzzle brake was mounted centrally in the superstructure, allowing the gun to traverse over a 40 degree arc. Elevation was limited to 40 degrees, and depression to 9.5 degrees. The more resilient M4 Sherman suspension units replaced the M3 type bogies. Stowage was provided for 88 high explosive and/or smoke shells and 16 armour-piercing (AP) rounds. The 25-pounder and a strengthened saddle were mounted on a bolster-and-beam assembly welded to the track sponsons, whilst the gun was equipped with the same sighting gear as the towed field gun, allowing for both direct and indirect laying.

=== Trials ===
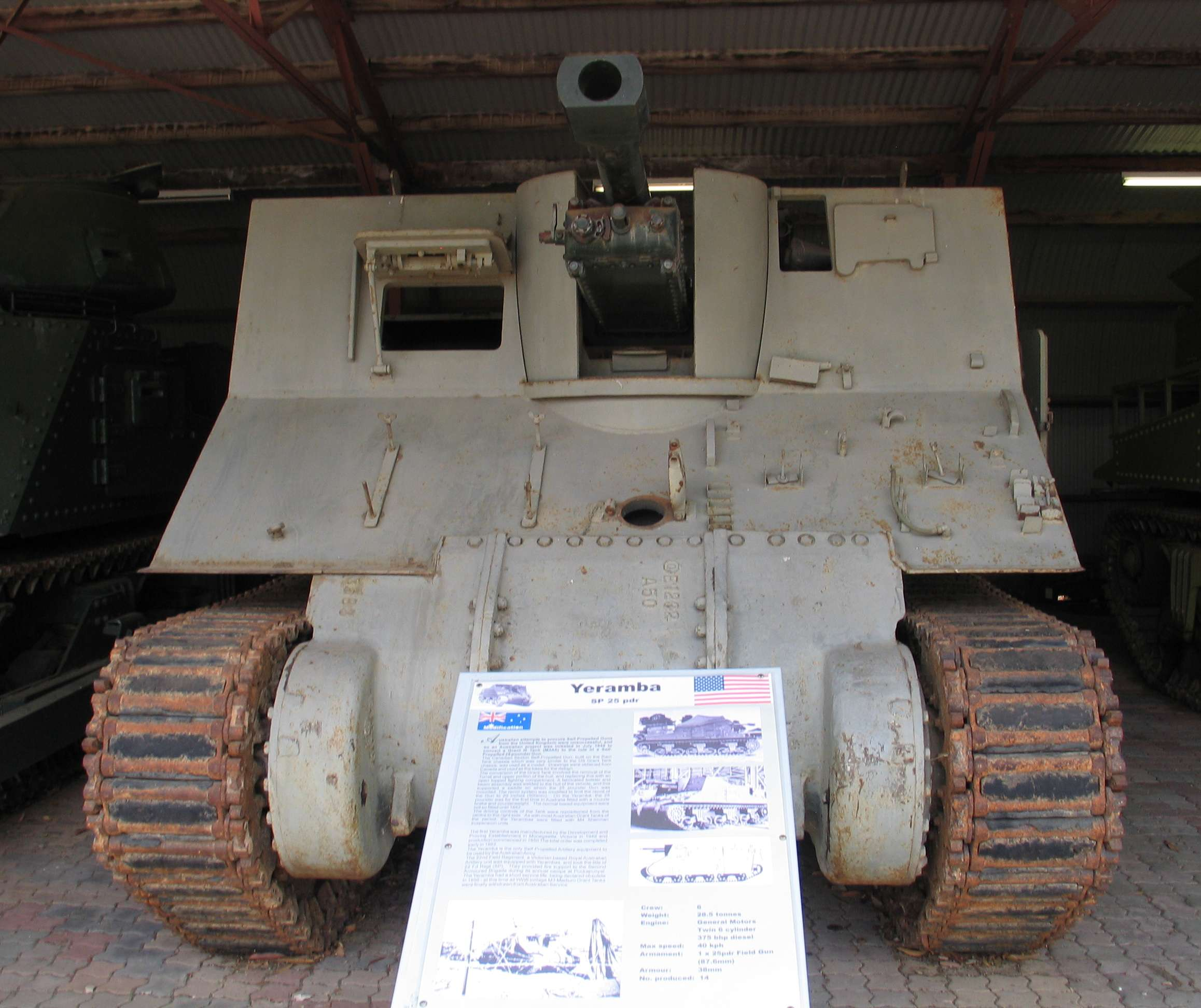
A Yeramba on display at the Royal Australian Armoured Corps Tank Museum

In July 1949, approval was given to convert one Grant to the self-propelled configuration and the prototype subsequently underwent user and firing trials at Puckapunyal in December 1949. It was then returned to the factory for modifications and completion of the stowage arrangements. Following general acceptance by the Army, authorisation was given in February 1950 to convert another 13 Grants to Yerambas. The first of these conversions was completed in November 1950 and the last was delivered in August 1952. One of the benefits of the conversion was standardisation, as the Grant tank was still used by the 2nd Armoured Brigade itself, whilst the 25 pounder field gun was also the standard field artillery equipment in service. It was also the cheapest available solution.

=== Operational service ===
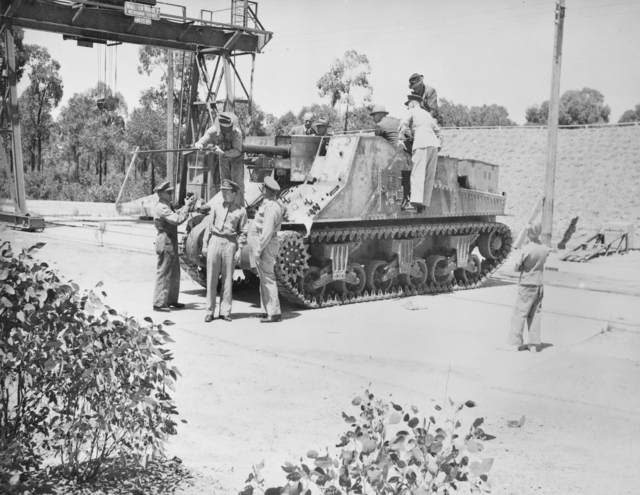
A group of officials inspecting the prototype Yeramba in 1949

A total of 14 vehicles underwent this conversion. Like many M3 medium tanks in Australia, the Yerambas were normally fitted with an additional cast armour plate of between 38 mm to 44 mm thickness bolted over the transmission housing and final drives on the nose of the vehicle. All of the Yerambas produced were issued to the 22nd Field Regiment, Royal Australian Artillery between 1950 and 1952 and based at Puckapunyal. The regiment subsequently adopted the Royal Australian Armoured Corps black beret with the Royal Australian Artillery cap badge, and were issued with AFV crewman's rubberised canvas soled boots. However, it was subsequently disbanded in 1957 and the Yerambas disposed of after being declared obsolete. They were never used operationally. (Note: Surviving Yerambas can be seen at the RAAC tank museum at Puckapunyal Victoria, and at the Melbourne Tank Museum in Narre Warren.) Despite the gruelling labour associated with maintaining them, the Yeramba was considered a very good weapon by its crews.

== Operators ==
- Australia: 14

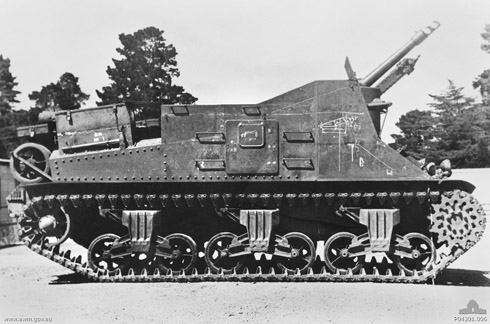
Side view of the prototype Yeramba

== Notes ==
Footnotes

Citations
