= John Richardson (Australian Army officer) =

Australian military officer (1880–1954)

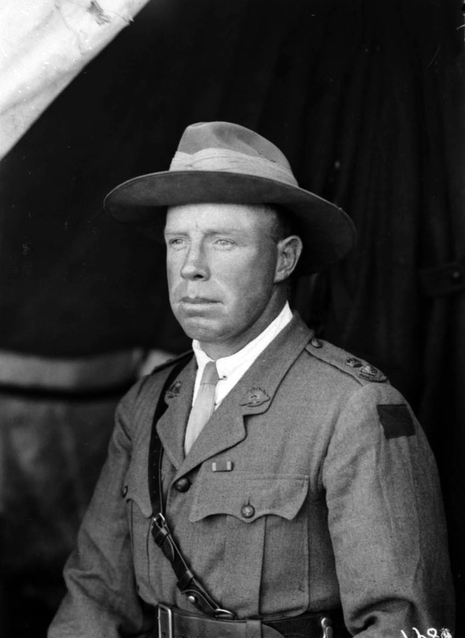
- Lieutenant Colonel John Richardson in the Middle East in November 1918
- Born: 23 April 1880; Raymond Terrace, New South Wales
- Died: 29 July 1954 (aged 74); Raymond Terrace, New South Wales
- Military career
- Allegiance: Australia
- Branch: Australian Army
- Service years: 1911–1942
- Rank: Major General
- Commands: 1st Cavalry Division (1936–42); 2nd Cavalry Brigade (1924–28); 16th Light Horse Regiment (1921–24); 7th Light Horse Regiment (1918–19)
- Conflicts: First World War; Gallipoli Campaign; Sinai and Palestine Campaign; Battle of Romani; First Battle of Gaza; Second Battle of Gaza; Second World War
- Awards: Distinguished Service Order; Colonial Auxiliary Forces Officers' Decoration; Mentioned in Despatches; Commander of the Order of the Nile (Egypt)

Major General John Dalyell Richardson, DSO, VD (23 April 1880 – 29 July 1954) was an Australian dairy farmer and a senior officer in the Australian Army during the Second World War.

Military offices
Preceded by Brigadier Arthur Mills	General Officer Commanding 1st Cavalry Division; 1936–1942	Succeeded by Major General Horace Robertson
