= 3rd Armoured Division (Australia) =

1942–1943 armoured formation of the Australian Army

Australian 3rd Armoured Division
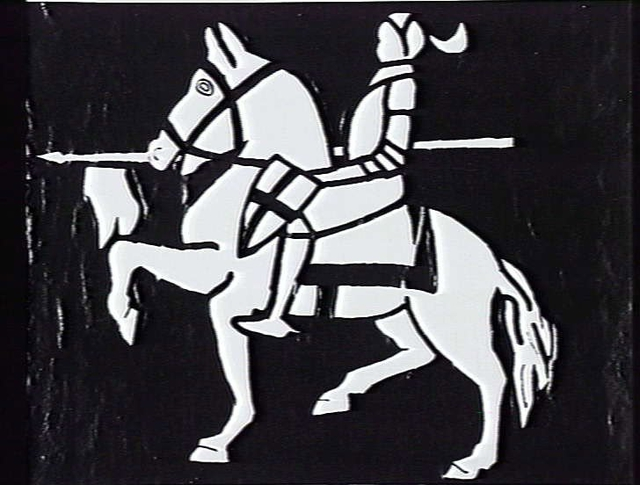
- 3rd Australian Armoured Division formation sign
- Active: 1921–1943
- Country: Australia
- Branch: Army
- Type: Armoured
- Battle honours: None

Commanders
- Notable commanders: Horace Robertson

Insignia
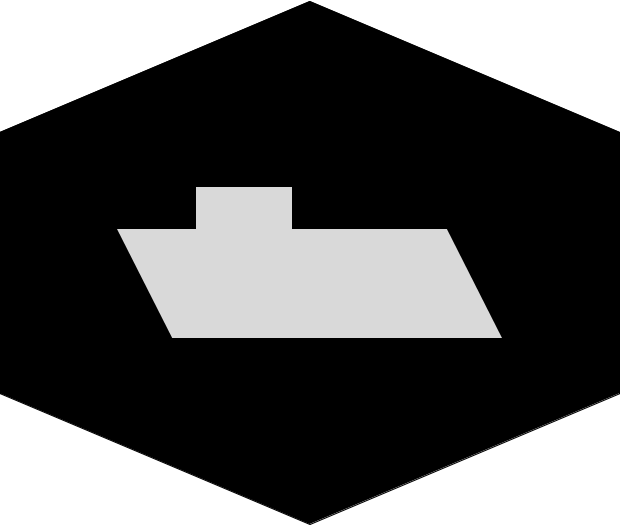
- Unit colour patch

The 3rd Armoured Division was an armoured unit of the Australian Army during World War II. Originally raised in 1921 as the 1st Cavalry Division, the formation had been converted into a motor division in early 1942, before adopting the armoured designation in November 1942. A Militia formation, the division undertook garrison duties in New South Wales and then Queensland and did not see combat before being disbanded in late 1943 and early 1944.

== History ==
The 3rd Armoured Division was first raised as the 1st Cavalry Division. In 1921, following the demobilisation of the Australian Imperial Force (AIF) that had been raised during World War I, Australia's part time military force, the Citizens Force, was reorganised to perpetuate the AIF's numerical designations. At this time, the 1st Cavalry Division was raised alongside a second cavalry division and four infantry divisions. At this time, the 1st Cavalry Division consisted of the 1st, 2nd and 4th Cavalry Brigades. The 1st was based in Queensland, while the other two were formed in New South Wales. The division's headquarters was in New South Wales.

At the outbreak of the war, the 1st Cavalry Division was allocated to the defence of coastal New South Wales. As part of defensive measures, the 1st and 2nd Infantry Divisions were tasked with defending Newcastle and Sydney, while the 1st Cavalry Division assumed the role of command reserve, based around Narellan. In April 1941, the division was reorganised to cover the northern and southern approaches to Sydney. Following Japan's entry into the war in December 1941, the Militia was called up for full time service, and the divisional headquarters was established at Richmond. In the south, the 2nd Cavalry Brigade was located at Armidale, covering the area between Armidale, Coffs Harbour and Rutherford, while the 4th Cavalry Brigade was located at Berrima covering Dapto, Nowra and Goulburn.

The 2nd Cavalry Brigade's headquarters moved to Gloucester in February 1942, assuming responsibility for the defence of Stroud and Dungog as well as Coffs Harbour and Armidale. As the mechanisation process began, several light horse regiments converted into motor regiments, and the division was redesignated as the 1st Motor Division in March 1942, with its two cavalry brigades being converted to motor brigades. There were plans to raise a third brigade for the division at this stage, designated the 7th Motor Brigade, but this was not completed.

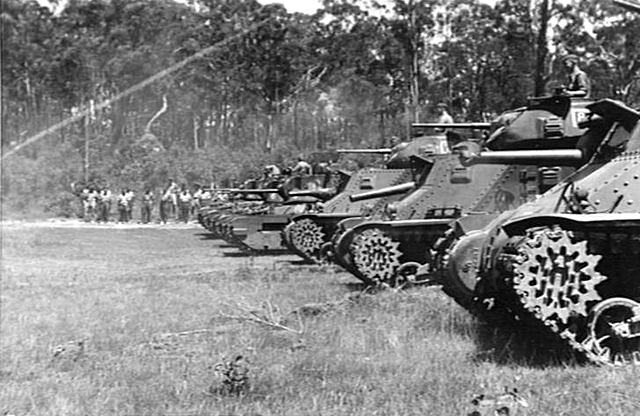
M3 Grant tanks similar to those used by 2nd Armoured Brigade

After divisional headquarters moved to Rutherford, the 12th and 15th Motor Regiments joined the division around Coffs Harbour and Grafton, while the 2nd Motor Brigade moved to Dungog, tasked with the defence of Newcastle. The following month, the division's support troops also moved to a concentration area west of Newcastle. The 2nd Infantry Division took over responsibility for the Newcastle area in May, after which the headquarters of the 4th Motor Brigade was converted into the 3rd Army Tank Brigade, while the 2nd Motor Brigade moved to Taree deploying units to Kempsey and Coffs Harbour. Several other motor regiments – the 15th and 16th – were transferred to other formations at this time, while others – the 14th and 24th – were disbanded.

Another move occurred in July for the divisional headquarters when it was re-established at Wauchope. While there, a large-scale reorganisation of the Australian armoured units took place. This saw the creation of three armoured regiments. The 2nd Motor Brigade was transferred at this time to the 2nd Armoured Division, but gained the 2nd Armoured Brigade. In October, the divisional headquarters moved to Coffs Harbour. The division was redesignated as the 3rd Armoured Division on 15 November 1942, as the designation of the 1st Armoured Division had already been assigned to a Second Australian Imperial Force unit. As an armoured division the 3rd Armoured was equipped with M3 Grant medium tanks and M3 Stuart light tanks. These were assigned to the 2nd Armoured Brigade's three 2nd AIF armoured regiments: the 2/4th, 2/8th and 2/9th.

The division began moving to Murgon in Queensland in December 1942, after which they were assigned a mobile defensive role, which required further training. The division's 3rd Motor Brigade was gradually disbanded between March and August 1943 and the 3rd Armoured Division began disbanding at Murgon, in Queensland, on 19 October 1943 as a result of manpower shortages in the Australian Army and the changing strategic situation. This process was not completed until March 1944. Two armoured regiments that had previously been assigned to the 3rd Armoured Division – the 2/4th and 2/9th – went on to serve in combat with the 4th Armoured Brigade.

== Composition ==
=== Order of battle upon formation ===
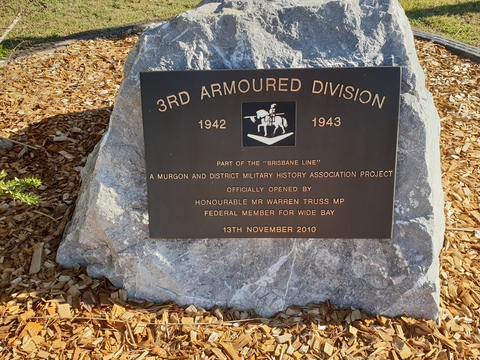
3rd Armoured Division Plaque - Murgon Showgrounds

Upon establishment as an armoured formation, the division's main elements were:

- Divisional Headquarters
- 12th Armoured Car Regiment
- 3rd Armoured Divisional Signals
- 2nd Armoured Brigade
  - 2/4th Armoured Regiment
  - 2/8th Armoured Regiment
  - 2/9th Armoured Regiment
- 1st Motor Brigade
  - 5th Motor Regiment
  - 11th Motor Regiment
  - 16th Motor Regiment
- Divisional Engineers
- Divisional Artillery
  - 21st Field Regiment, Royal Australian Artillery
  - 231st & 232nd Light Anti-Aircraft Batteries, Royal Australian Artillery
  - 5th & 5th Anti Tank Batteries, Royal Australian Artillery
- Divisional Medical, Service and Administration Troops

=== Order of battle upon disbandment ===
At the time of its disbandment, the main elements of the 3rd Armoured Division were:

- Divisional Headquarters
- 12th Armoured Car Regiment
- 3rd Armoured Divisional Signals
- 2nd Armoured Brigade
  - 2/4th Armoured Regiment
  - 13th Armoured Regiment
  - 20th Motor Regiment
- Division Engineers
- Divisional Artillery
  - 21st/22nd Field Regiment, Royal Australian Artillery
  - 122nd Light Anti-Aircraft Regiment, Royal Australian Artillery
  - 5th & 5th Anti Tank Batteries, Royal Australian Artillery
- Divisional Medical, Service and Administration Troops

== Commanding officers ==
During World War II, the division was commanded by the following officers:

- Major General John Richardson
- Major General Horace Robertson
- Major General William Steele
- Major General William Locke
- Major General William Bridgeford

== See also ==
- Australian armoured units of World War II
