= 2/9th Armoured Regiment (Australia) =

Armoured regiment of the Australian Army

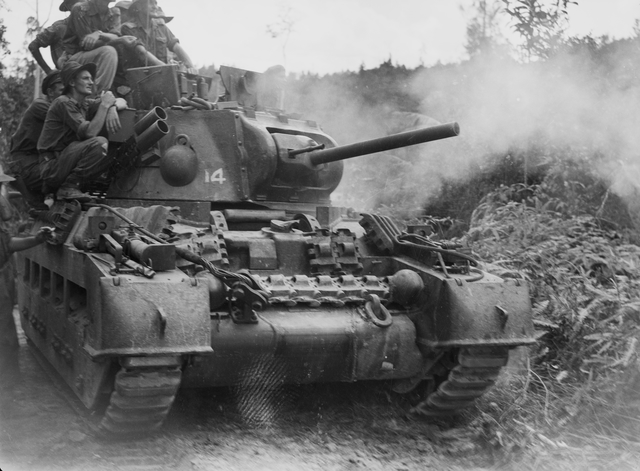
- A 2/9th Armoured Regiment Matilda II firing its three-inch howitzer at Japanese positions during the Battle of Tarakan
- Active: 1941–1946
- Country: Australia
- Branch: Australian Army
- Type: Armoured
- Equipment: M3 Stuart, M3 Grant and Matilda II tanks
- Engagements: World War II: Borneo Campaign

Insignia
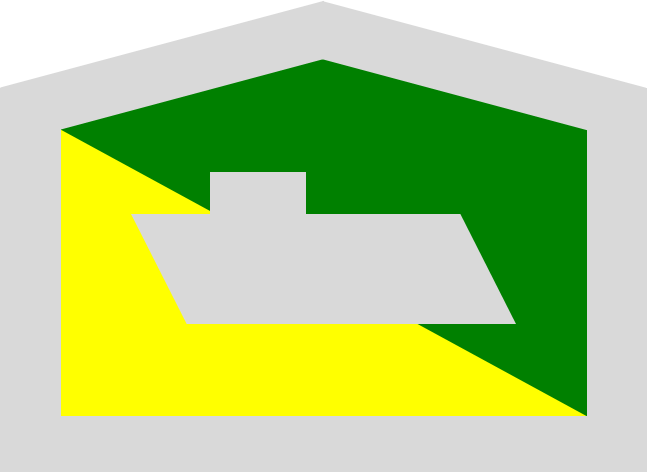
- Unit colour patch

The 2/9th Armoured Regiment was an armoured regiment of the Australian Army. Raised for service during World War II, the regiment was formed in August 1941 and spent most of the war in Australia. It was disbanded in early 1946 after seeing action in the Borneo campaign late in the war.

== History ==
The 2/9th Armoured Regiment was formed in August 1941 as part of the 2nd Armoured Brigade of the 1st Armoured Division. Under the command of Lieutenant Colonel F.E Wells, upon formation the regiment perpetuated the 9th Light Horse Regiment which had served during World War I, drawing its personnel from volunteers for overseas service from the states of South Australia and Tasmania. Consisting of a regimental headquarters and three fighting squadrons designated 'A', 'B' and 'C', the 2/9th was initially located at Puckapunyal, Victoria, and because of a shortage of armoured vehicles in Australia at the time, the regiment was equipped with Universal Carriers for training purposes until a more suitable platform became available. In May 1942 the regiment was equipped with M3 Grant tanks and moved to Narrabri, New South Wales, where it took part in large-scale divisional exercises.

In early 1943 manpower shortages and the evolving strategic situation confronting the Allies in the Pacific meant that there was no longer a need for large-scale armoured formations in the Australian Army. As a result, the decision was made to disband a number of units and reallocate their personnel to other branches of the Army. After the 1st Armoured Division was disbanded in September 1943, the 2/9th Armoured Regiment was reassigned to the 4th Armoured Brigade, which was the Australian Army's specialist jungle warfare armoured unit at the time. It was relocated to Singleton, New South Wales, but was later moved to the Atherton Tablelands in Queensland and in early 1944 it was re-equipped with Matilda II tanks. During this time it undertook infantry co-operation training in preparation for deployment overseas.

In March 1945 the 2/9th Armoured Regiment embarked for Morotai in the Netherlands East Indies as part of the buildup for one of the final campaigns of the war. The regiment was attached to the 9th Division during the Borneo campaign to provide armoured support. As the 9th Division's operations would take place in a number of locations at different times, the regiment formed a number of squadron-groups which would be attached at brigade-level. The first element of the regiment to see action was 'C' Squadron, which supported the 26th Brigade during the Battle of Tarakan in May and June and taking part in the advance along the Anzac and Bourke Highways, helping to secure the airfield and the oilfields. On 10 June 1945, 'B' Squadron took part in the landing at Labuan as part of Operation Oboe Six, and supported the 24th Brigade's advance, assisting in the capture of the airfield, and various positions along the MacArthur Road. At the same time, 'A' Squadron landed on the Borneo peninsula, securing the town before being used in a defensive role due to the impenetrable terrain further inland, which was only passable on foot.

Hostilities came to an end in August 1945, however the 2/9th Armoured Regiment did not return to Australia until December 1945. It was disbanded shortly afterwards in early 1946. Nine men from the regiment were killed in action or died on active service during the course of its involvement in the fighting, while a further 16 were wounded. Members of the 2/9th received the following decorations: one Military Cross and two Military Medals.

== Commanding officers ==
The following is a list of officers that commanded the 2/9th Armoured Regiment:

- Lieutenant Colonel Frank Elwyn Wells (July 1941 – January 1942);
- Lieutenant Colonel Thomas Evelyn Williams (January 1942 – March 1943);
- Lieutenant Colonel Alexander Elder McIntyre (March 1943 – August 1945);
- Major John Brinsden Lathlean (August 1945 – 1946).

== Battle honours ==
The 2/9th Armoured Regiment received three battle honours for its service during the war:

- South-West Pacific 1945, Tarakan, and Labuan.
