= 2/8th Armoured Regiment (Australia) =

Armoured regiment of the Australian Army

- Active: 1941–1944
- Country: Australia
- Branch: Australian Army
- Type: Armoured
- Equipment: M3 Stuart and M3 Grant tanks
- Engagements: World War II: New Guinea campaign

Insignia
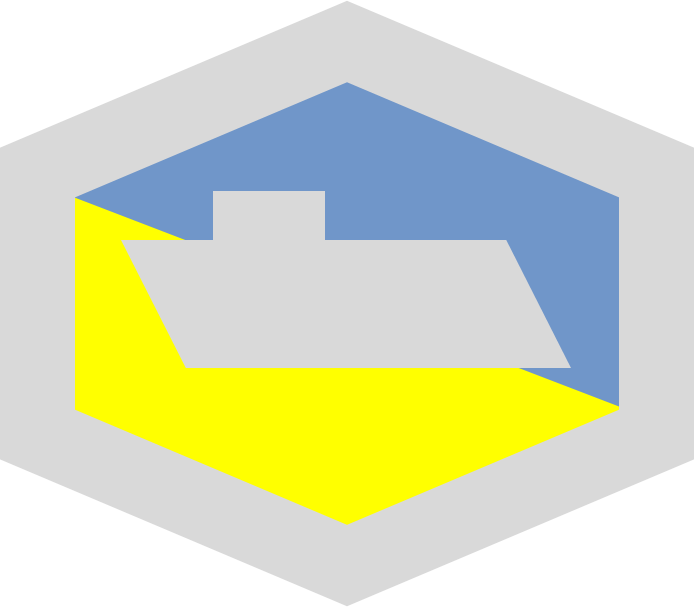
- Unit colour patch

The 2/8th Armoured Regiment was an armoured regiment of the Australian Army. It was raised for service during World War II, being formed in July 1941. It deployed to New Guinea in 1943 but did not see any action before being disbanded in February 1944.

== History ==
The 2/8th Armoured Regiment was formed in July 1941 as part of the 2nd Armoured Brigade of the 1st Armoured Division. Under the command of Lieutenant Colonel William Hopkins who had previously served in the Militia with the 13th Light Horse Regiment, the 2/8th was initially located at Puckapunyal, Victoria, and was equipped with Universal Carriers for training purposes while more suitable platforms were acquired. In May 1942 the regiment was equipped with M3 Grant tanks and moved to Narrabri, New South Wales. During its time at Narrabri one of the regiment's three armoured squadrons was re-equipped with M3 Stuart light tanks, in order to conform with the establishment that had been set for armoured units being deployed to the Middle East. During this time, the other two squadrons' vehicles were converted from petrol engines to diesel.

From 15 November 1942 the 2nd Armoured Brigade and the 2/8th Armoured Regiment formed part of the 3rd Armoured Division. The regiment was separated from its brigade in April 1943 and deployed to New Guinea where it took over the 2/6th Armoured Regiment's tanks. The regiment's role was confined to infantry co-operation training and static defence of major Australian bases. As a result, it did not see any action. Squadrons were stationed at Port Moresby, Milne Bay and Buna.

The 2/8th Armoured Regiment returned to Australia in February 1944 and was disbanded in May. The regiment's personnel formed the nucleus of the 41st, 42nd and 43rd Landing Craft Companies, Royal Australian Engineers, which supported Australian forces in the South West Pacific until the end of the war. The regiment did not receive any battle honours, nor did any of its personnel receive any gallantry decorations. Three of the regiment's personnel died while on active service.

== Commanding officers ==
The following is a list of officers that commanded the 2/8th Armoured Regiment:

- Lieutenant Colonel W.G Hopkins (June – December 1941);
- Lieutenant Colonel R.J.M Gordon (December 1941 – April 1942);
- Lieutenant Colonel A.D.S Ryrie (April 1942 – March 1943);
- Lieutenant Colonel F.D Marshall (March 1943 – February 1944);
- Lieutenant Colonel A.B Millard (February 1944 – May 1944).
