= William Steele (Australian Army officer) =

Australian Army general

William Alan Beevor Steele
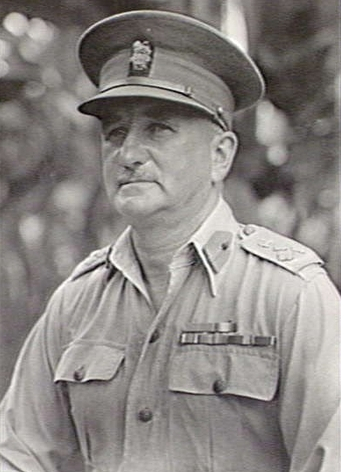
- Brigadier William Steele in September 1945
- Born: 4 February 1895; Gympie, Queensland
- Died: 20 January 1966 (aged 70)
- Military career
- Allegiance: Australia
- Branch: Australian Army
- Service years: 1911–1950
- Rank: Major general
- Commands: 7th Brigade (1948–50); 33rd Brigade (1945); Moresby Base Sub-Area (1943–44); 3rd Armoured Division (1942–43); 1st Motor Division (1942); 7th Military District (1940)
- Conflicts: First World War; Gallipoli campaign; Western Front; Second World War; New Guinea campaign
- Awards: Commander of the Order of the British Empire

Major General William Alan Beevor Steele, CBE (4 February 1895 – 20 January 1966) was a senior officer in the Australian Army during the Second World War.

== Early life and education ==
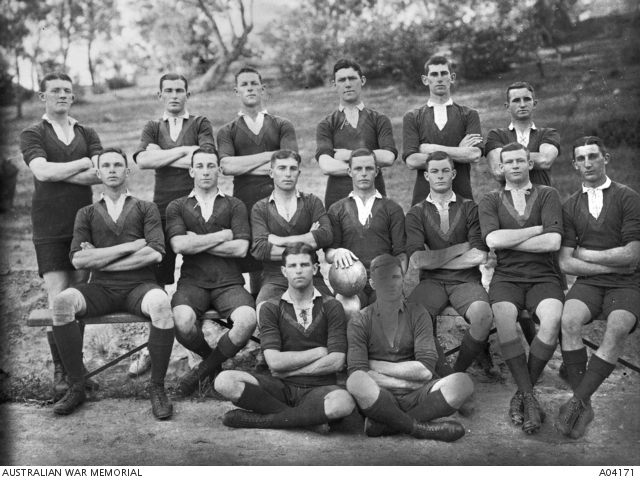
Members of the first fifteen, first grade rugby team, at the RMC, Duntroon, 1913. William A. B. Steele is stood in the back row, on the extreme right.

William Alan Beevor Steele was born on 4 February 1895, in Gympie, Queensland, Australia, to Charles Steele, a mining engineer, and Mary Tymons. He was a great-great-great grandson of Sir Thomas Beevor, 1st Baronet of Hethel, Norfolk. Steele entered the Royal Military College, Duntroon, in 1911 and graduated early in 1914 due to the outbreak of World War I.

== World War I ==
Steele was commissioned as a lieutenant in the Australian Imperial Force and served in the 2nd Light Horse Regiment. He participated in the Gallipoli campaign and later served on the Western Front, where he was mentioned in dispatches in July 1917.

== Interwar period ==
Between the wars, Steele continued to serve in the military, holding various staff positions. He attended the }Staff College, Camberley in England from 1936 to 1937 and was promoted to brevet lieutenant colonel in 1935.

== World War II ==
During World War II, Steele held a series of significant commands that showcased his leadership and strategic capabilities. In 1942, he was appointed general officer commanding of the 1st Australian Motor Division, and later took command of the 3rd Australian Armoured Division in New Guinea, serving from 1942 to 1943. Steele's experience in these roles would have been invaluable in the challenging environment of the Pacific theater.

Steele also played a crucial role in overseeing military logistics and operations as commanding officer of Moresby Base Sub-Area, New Guinea Force. His responsibilities likely included managing supply chains, coordinating troop movements, and ensuring the smooth operation of military bases.

Later in the war, Steele served as deputy quartermaster-general at Army Headquarters, where he would have been responsible for overseeing the procurement and distribution of military supplies and equipment. His leadership and organizational skills were likely essential in supporting the Australian military's efforts during this time.

== Post-war career ==
After the war, Steele commanded the 7th Infantry Brigade from 1948 to 1950 and retired from the army in 1950 with the rank of major general. He was appointed a Commander of the Order of the British Empire (CBE) in 1948 for his service in New Guinea Force.

He died in January 1966, at the age of 70.
