= Hongorai River =

River in Papua New Guinea

Coordinates: 6°47′48.83″S 155°34′8.95″E

The Hongorai River is a river on the southern coast of Bougainville Island.

It is located within the Autonomous Region of Bougainville, in northeastern Papua New Guinea.
