= Battle of Timor order of battle =

Coordinates: 10°23′S 123°38′E

This is the order of battle for the Battle of Timor (1942–43) which occurred on the island of Timor, in the Pacific theatre of World War II. It involved forces from the Empire of Japan—which invaded on February 20, 1942—on one side and Allied personnel, predominantly from Australia and the Netherlands, on the other. Many Timorese civilians and some Portuguese colonists fought with the Allies as criados (guerrillas), or provided food, shelter and other assistance.

== Initial order of battle ==
=== Portugal ===
==== Portuguese Colonial Army units ====
- HQ Timor (Repartição Militar de Timor)
- Native Rifle Company (Companhia de Caçadores Indígenas)
- Oecussi detachment of the Native Rifle Company
- Border Cavalry Platoon

==== Portuguese civil and auxiliary forces ====
- Dili Police Corps (Corpo de Polícia de Dili)
- Civil administration sepoys
- Timorese militias and auxiliaries

=== Allied ===
==== Sparrow Force units ====
- HQ Sparrow Force
- 2/40th Infantry Battalion
- 2/2nd Independent Company
- 2/1st Heavy Battery
- [A & C Troops, 79th Light Anti-Aircraft Battery], (British Royal Artillery)
- 75th Light Aid Detachment
- 2/1st Fortress Engineers
- 2/1st Fortress Signals
- B Troop, 18th Anti-Tank Battery
- No.2 Section, 2/11th Field Company
- 23rd Brigade Signals
- 2/12th Field Ambulance
- 22nd Dental Unit
- Australian Army Service Corps

==== Royal Netherlands East Indies Army (KNIL) units ====
- Timor and Dependencies Garrison Battalion
- 3rd Company, VIII Infantry Battalion
- Reservekorps (RK) Infantry Company
- Machine-Gun Platoon, XIII Infantry Battalion
- Artillery battery (4 × 75 mm guns)
- Engineer platoon
- Engineer platoon
- Mobile auxiliary first aid platoon

=== Empire of Japan ===
- 228th Regimental Group
- 3rd Yokosuka Special Naval Landing Force (detachment)
