= Sparrow Force =

Allied formation deployed to Timor during World War II

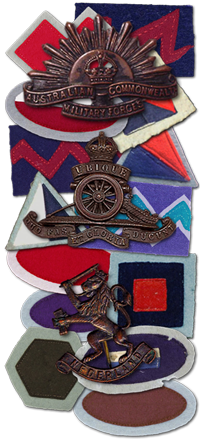
- Sparrow Force cap badges and unit patches
- Active: 1942
- Disbanded: 1946
- Country: Netherlands; Australia; United Kingdom
- Allegiance: Allies
- Branch: Royal Netherlands East Indies Army; Australian Army; British Army
- Type: Ad hoc, Guerrilla
- Role: Frustrate enemy advance
- Size: Total – 1852 West Timor; 2/40 Inf. Bn. AIF – 944; 2/1st Heavy Battery – 132; 79 LAA Bty RA – 189; Attached units – 305 East Timor 2/2nd Ind. Co. – 282 (+ 152 joined from West Timor)
- Garrison/HQ: Force Hill, West Timor
- Mottos: "They Alone Did Not Surrender" – Winston Churchill
- Anniversaries: 23 February
- Engagements: Second World War: Battle of Timor
- Battle honours: Koepang, Timor

Commanders
- Notable commanders: Nico Leonard Willem van Straten; William Leggatt; W. C. D. Veale; Alexander Spence

Sparrow Force Casualties
Location	Far East

Casualties and losses
Total Casualties; Australian Army; British Army Killed in action Missing presumed dead Wounded; Executed; Service related accidents Illness: Burma-Siam; Japan; Malaya/Singapore; Java, Sumatra; Australia; Hellship Drowning	415; 368; 47 63; 29; 21; 16; 12; 128 (Total): 72; 33; 5; 14; 4; 120

Sparrow Force was a detachment based on the 2/40th Australian Infantry Battalion and other Dutch, British, US and Australian 8th Division units during World War II. The force was formed to defend the island of Timor from invasion by the Empire of Japan. It formed the main part of the Allied units in the Battle of Timor.

The force began deploying in late 1941, and following Japan's entry into the war, it was drawn into the fighting in response to the Japanese invasion of Portuguese and Dutch Timor in February 1942. After heavy fighting around Irekum, the main element of the force – the 2/40th – were forced to surrender on 23 February 1942; however, elements of the force, specifically commandos from the 2/2nd Independent Company, supported by the local population, continued a guerrilla campaign and inflicted heavy casualties on the Japanese until August, when the Japanese launched a counter-offensive. Despite reinforcements from the 2/4th Independent Company arriving in September 1942, the Japanese offensive eventually resulted in the withdrawal of Allied troops over the period December 1942 to January 1943, with the commandos being withdrawn by sea. Sparrow Force personnel who were captured during the fighting were sent to Japanese labour camps across Southeast Asia, and between 1942 and 1945, many died in captivity.

== Background ==
In December 1941, due to concerns about a Japanese invasion, the Dutch requested that Australian forces be sent to both Koepang and Ambon under provisions that had been agreed to in a conference at Singapore earlier in the year. That plan, entitled "Plans for the employment of naval and air forces of the associated powers in the eastern theatre in the event of war with Japan" (Plenaps), had already resulted in the disposition of forces, including some U.S. fleet movements, as early as November 1941. Initially, Australian plans were to send forces only to Koepang with the resulting order to embark the force at Darwin, designated "Sparrow," on 7 December 1941 using the transport SS Zealandia and the armed cruiser HMAS Westralia, which were available in the port. The decision to exclude Ambon was quickly changed with 1,090 troops designated "Gull Force" sent to Ambon from Darwin on 14 December using three Dutch merchant ships.

In January 1942, the Allied forces on Timor became a key link in the so-called "Malay Barrier", defended by the short-lived American-British-Dutch-Australian Command under the overall command of General Sir Archibald Wavell. Additional Australian support staff arrived at Kupang on 12 February, including Brigadier William Veale, who had been made the Allied commanding officer on Timor. By this time, many members of Sparrow Force—most of whom were unprepared for tropical conditions—were suffering from malaria and other illnesses. The airfield at Penfui in Dutch Timor also became a key air link between Australia and American forces fighting in the Philippines under General Douglas MacArthur. Penfui came under attack from Japanese aircraft on 26 and 30 January 1942, but the raids were hampered by the British anti-aircraft gunners and, to a lesser degree, by P-40 fighters of the 33rd Pursuit Squadron, United States Army Air Forces, 11 of which were based in Darwin.

== Composition ==
The majority of Sparrow Force personnel were from the 2/40th Infantry Battalion, which had been formed in Tasmania and was part of the 23rd Australian Infantry Brigade. The force was initially commanded by Lieutenant Colonel William Leggatt, although later command was taken over by Brigadier William Veale before being passed on to Lieutenant Colonel Alexander Spence. A commando unit—the 2/2nd Independent Company (recruited mostly in Western Australia)—was also part of Sparrow Force. With the other forces from the 23rd Brigade, it shared contingents from 18 Anti-Tank Battery, the 2/12th Field Ambulance, 23rd Brigade Signals and the 2/11th Field Company. Zealandia departed Darwin on the morning of 10 December 1941 with 957 troops escorted by HMAS Westralia with another 445 troops reaching Koepang on 12 December.

Rabaul fell to the Japanese on 23 January, followed by Ambon on 3 February, and both Gull Force and Lark Force were destroyed. Sparrow Force was reinforced on 16 February 1942 with 189 British anti-aircraft gunners, from A & C Troops of the 79th Light Anti-Aircraft Battery of the Royal Artillery, most of whom were veterans of the Battle of Britain. They were attacked by Japanese bombers as their ship anchored at Tenau. Later that day, an Allied convoy carrying reinforcements and supplies to Kupang—escorted by the heavy cruiser USS Houston, the destroyer USS Peary, and the sloops HMAS Swan and Warrego—came under intense Japanese air attack and was forced to return to Darwin without landing. The reinforcements had included an Australian pioneer battalion—the 2/4th Pioneer Battalion—and the US 49th Artillery Battalion. Sparrow Force could not be reinforced further and as the Japanese moved to complete their envelopment of the Netherlands East Indies, Timor was seemingly the next logical target.

The 2/40th and most Sparrow Force units were based at Penfui Airfield, outside the capital of Netherlands Timor, Kupang. The 2/2nd Independent Company was based across the border, at Dili in Portuguese Timor.

=== Sparrow Force units ===
The following units formed Sparrow Force:

- HQ Sparrow Force – 20 troops.
- 2/40th Infantry Battalion – 944 troops.
- 2/2nd Independent Company – 282 commandos (joined by 152 from West Timor.)
- 2/1st Heavy Battery RAA – 132 gunners.
- A & C Troops, 79th Light Anti-Aircraft Battery, (British Royal Artillery) – 189 gunners.
- 75th Light Aid Detachment – 14 troops.
- 2/1st Fortress Engineers – 56 sappers.
- 2/1st Fortress Signals – 39 signallers.
- B Troop, 18th Anti-Tank Battery RAA – 27 gunners.
- No.2 Section, 2/11th Field Company RAE – 66 sappers.
- 23rd Brigade Signals RASC – 8 signallers.
- 2/12th Field Ambulance RAAMC – 50 medics.
- 22nd Dental Unit RAAMC – 5 medics.
- Australian Army Service Corps – 20 servicemen.

==== Royal Netherlands East Indies Army (KNIL) units ====
The following KNIL units were assigned:

- Timor and Dependencies Garrison Battalion
- 3rd Company, VIII Infantry Battalion
- Reservekorps (RK) Infantry Company
- Machine-Gun Platoon, XIII Infantry Battalion
- Artillery battery (4 × 75 mm guns)
- Engineer platoon
- Engineer platoon
- Mobile auxiliary first aid platoon

== Battle ==
=== Japanese invasion of Portuguese Timor, 19–20 February 1942 ===
On the night of 19/20 February 1942, a force of 1,518 troops from the Imperial Japanese Army's 228th Regimental Group, which formed part of the 38th Division, XVI Army, under the command of Colonel Sadashichi Doi, began landing in Dili. Initially, the Japanese ships were mistaken for vessels carrying Portuguese reinforcements, and the Allies were caught by surprise. Nevertheless, they were well-prepared, and the garrison began an orderly withdrawal, covered by the 18-strong Australian commando No. 2 Section stationed at the airfield. According to Australian accounts of the resistance to the Japanese landings at Dili, the commandos killed an estimated 200 Japanese in the first hours of the battle, although the Japanese army recorded its casualties as including only seven men. Native accounts of the landings support the Australian claims, however.

Another group of Australian commandos, No. 7 Section, was less fortunate, driving into a Japanese roadblock by chance. According to Brad Manera of the Australian War Memorial, despite surrendering, all but one of their number were executed by the Japanese. Colin Doig provides different figures, though, stating that of the 14 men on the truck, 13 were shot, with one surviving (Keith Hayes) and one (Peter Alexander) being marched away to be a POW for the rest of the war. Both men survived the war. Outnumbered, the surviving Australians then withdrew to the south and to the east, into the mountainous interior. Van Straten and 200 Dutch East Indies troops headed southwest toward the border.

=== Japanese landings in Dutch Timor, 19–20 February 1942 ===
On the same night, Allied forces in Dutch Timor also came under extremely intense air attacks, which had already caused the small RAAF force to be withdrawn to Australia. The bombing was followed up by the landing of the main body of the 228th Regimental Group—two battalions totalling around 4,000 men—on the undefended southwest side of the island, at the Paha River. Five Type 94 tankettes were landed to support the Japanese infantry, and the force advanced north, cutting off the Dutch positions in the west and attacking the 2/40th Battalion positions at Penfui. A Japanese company thrust north-east to Usua, aiming to cut off the Allied retreat. In response Sparrow Force HQ was immediately moved further east, towards Champlong.

Leggatt ordered the destruction of the airfield, but the Allied line of retreat towards Champlong had been cut off by the dropping of about 500 Japanese marine paratroopers, from the 3rd Yokosuka Special Naval Landing Force, near Usua, 22 km (14 mi) east of Kupang.

After heavy resistance around the village of Babau and a second airdrop of 300 paratroopers, Sparrow Force cleared the village by the night of the 21st with plans to move eastward in the morning. By then, the Japanese had dug in defensive positions on Usua Ridge with a mountain howitzer and heavy machine guns near the road. After an Australian mortar and machine gun barrage, Captain Johnson of A Company, Captain Roff of B Company and Captain Burr of C Company led their platoons in a bayonet charge up the ridge, followed by R Company (Reinforcements). Gunners of the 2/1st Heavy Battery and sappers of the 2/1st Fortress Engineers reinforced the infantry platoons in the action. After the devastating assault on the paratroopers, Sparrow Force had killed all but 78 of the 850 paratroopers. Sparrow Force suffered only a few dozen losses.

Sparrow Force was then attacked from the west by the main Japanese force of about 3,000 men with tanks and artillery units. By destroying the bridges as they advanced east, Sparrow Force achieved only a brief respite. By the morning of 23 February Sparrow Force had been engaged from the rear by the main Japanese force once again. With his men low on ammunition, out of food and water, weary from little sleep, and hopelessly outnumbered, Leggatt surrendered at Irekum on 23 February. Both forces were bombed by Japanese aircraft in two waves at 10:00 am and 10:10 am and more men from both sides were killed. More Japanese then landed at Koepang, which brought their numbers up to about 22,000 in Dutch West Timor.

The 2/40th Battalion had suffered 84 killed and 132 wounded in the fighting, while more than twice that number would die as prisoners of war during the next two and a half years. Veale and the Sparrow Force HQ force who were at Tjamplong and not in the main column at Irekum—including about 290 Australian and Dutch troops—continued eastward across the border, to link up with the 2/2 Independent Company. After months of training, some formed Platoon D of the 2nd Independent Company.

=== On their own, February – April 1942 ===
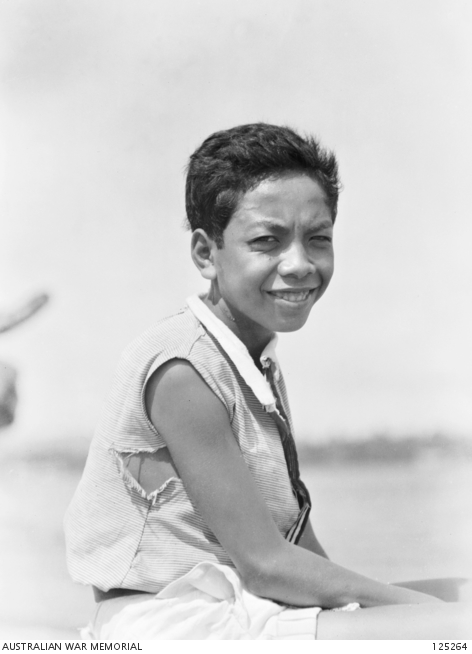
Akiu, one of the Timorese, who assisted the Sparrow Force

Between the capitulation at Irekum and 19 April 1942, the communication link with the Australian mainland was broken. By the end of February, the Japanese controlled most of Dutch Timor and the area around Dili in the northeast. However, they could not move into the south and east of the island without fear of attack. The 2/2nd Independent Company was specially trained for commando-style, stay behind operations and it had its own engineers and signalers, although it lacked heavy weapons and vehicles. The commandos were hidden throughout the mountains of Portuguese Timor, and they commenced raids against the Japanese, assisted by Timorese guides, native carriers and mountain ponies. Although Portuguese officials—under Governor Manuel de Abreu Ferreira de Carvalho—remained officially neutral and in charge of civil affairs, both the Portuguese and the indigenous East Timorese were usually sympathetic to the Allies, who were able to use the local telephone system to communicate among themselves and to gather intelligence on Japanese movements. However, the Allies initially did not have functioning radio equipment and were unable to contact Australia to inform them of their continued resistance.

Doi sent the Australian honorary consul, David Ross, also the local Qantas agent, to find the commandos and pass on a demand to surrender. Spence responded: "Surrender? Surrender be fucked!" Ross gave the commandos information on the disposition of Japanese forces and also provided a note in Portuguese, stating that anyone supplying them would be later reimbursed by the Australian government.

=== Australian commandos continue to resist, April – August 1942 ===
"Force intact. Still fighting. Badly need boots, quinine, money, and Tommy-gun ammunition."

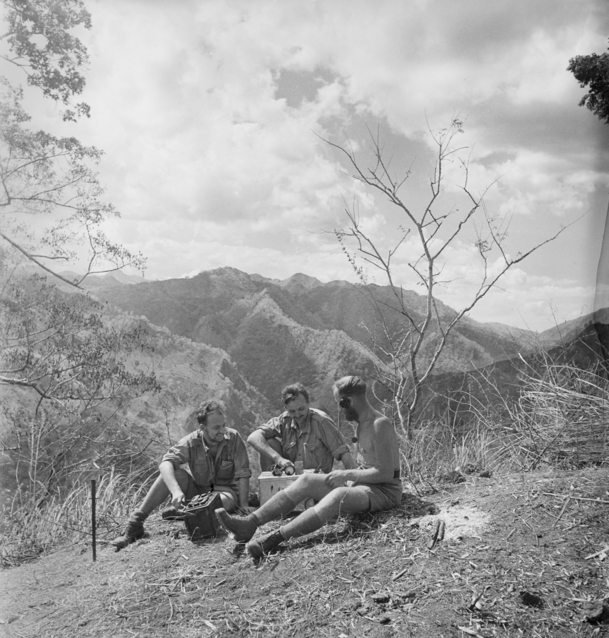
Signaller Keith Richards, Corporal John Donovan and Sergeant John Henry Sargent (left to right), from the Australian 2/2nd Independent Company, using a radio on a mountain top in Japanese-occupied Timor, in about November 1942. (Photograph by Damien Parer.)

In early March, Veale and Van Straten's forces linked up with the 2/2nd Company. Included in this group were several specialist electrical engineers. Captain George Parker, Signaller Keith Richards, Corporal John Donovan, Signaller Jack Loveless, and Sergeant Jack Sargeant built a radio out of recycled parts, which they called "Winnie the War Winner", and re-established contact with Darwin. Supplies were soon airdropped to the guerrilla force followed by continuing resupply from the sea.

The Japanese high command sent a highly regarded veteran of the Malayan campaign and the Battle of Singapore, a major known as the "Tiger of Singapore" (or "Singapore Tiger"; his real name is unknown), to Timor. On 22 May, the "Tiger"—mounted on a white horse—led a Japanese force towards Remexio. An Australian patrol, with Portuguese and Timorese assistance, staged an ambush and killed four or five of the Japanese soldiers. During a second ambush, Ray Aitken (an Australian sniper) shot and killed the "Tiger". Another 24 Japanese soldiers were also killed, and the force retreated to Dili. On 24 May, Veale and Van Straten were evacuated from the south east coast by an RAAF Catalina and Spence was appointed commanding officer, after being promoted to lieutenant colonel. On 27 May, Royal Australian Navy (RAN) launches successfully completed the first supply and evacuation missions to Timor.

In June, General Douglas MacArthur—now the Supreme Allied Commander in the South West Pacific Area—was advised by General Thomas Blamey—Allied land force commander—that a full-scale Allied offensive in Timor would require a major amphibious assault, including at least one infantry division (at least 10,000 personnel). Because of this requirement and the overall Allied strategy of recapturing areas to the east, in New Guinea and the Solomon Islands, Blamey recommended that the campaign in Timor should be sustained for as long as possible, but not expanded. This suggestion was ultimately adopted.

Relations between Ferreira de Carvalho and the Japanese deteriorated. His telegraph link with the Portuguese Government in Lisbon was cut. In June 1942, a Japanese official complained that the Governor had rejected Japanese demands to punish Portuguese officials and Timorese and civilians who had assisted the "invading army" (the Australians). On 24 June, the Japanese formally complained to Lisbon, but did not take any action against Ferreira de Carvalho. Meanwhile, Doi once again sent Ross with a message, complimenting Sparrow Force on its campaign so far, and again asking that it surrender. The Japanese commander drew a parallel with the efforts of Afrikaner commandos of the Second Boer War and said that he realised it would take a force 10 times that of the Allies to win. Nevertheless, Doi said he was receiving reinforcements, and would eventually assemble the necessary units. This time Ross did not return to Dili, and he was evacuated to Australia on 16 July.

=== Japanese counter-offensive, August 1942 ===
In August, the Japanese 48th Division—commanded by Lieutenant General Yuichi Tsuchihashi—began arriving from the Philippines and garrisoned Kupang, Dili and Malacca, relieving the Ito detachment. Their goal was to outnumber the commandos by 100 to 1. The Japanese estimated Sparrow Force to be battalion strength in East Timor. Tsuchihashi then launched a major counter-offensive in an attempt to push the Australians into a corner on the south coast of the island. Strong Japanese columns moved south—two from Dili and one from Manatuto on the northeast coast. Another moved eastward from Dutch Timor to attack Dutch positions in the central south of the island. The offensive ended on 19 August when the main Japanese force was withdrawn to Rabaul, but not before they secured the central town of Maubisse and the southern port of Beco. The Japanese were also recruiting significant numbers of Timorese civilians, who provided intelligence on Allied movements. Meanwhile, also in late-August, a parallel conflict began when the Maubisse rebelled against the Portuguese.

During September the main body of the Japanese 48th Division began arriving to take over the campaign. The Australians also sent reinforcements, in the form of the 450-strong 2/4th Independent Company—known as "Lancer Force"—which arrived on 23 September. The destroyer HMAS Voyager ran aground at the southern port of Betano while landing the 2/4th, and had to be abandoned after it came under air attack. The ship's crew was safely evacuated by HMAS Kalgoorlie and Warrnambool on 25 September 1942 and the ship destroyed by demolition charges. On 27 September, the Japanese mounted a thrust from Dili towards the wreck of Voyager, but without any significant success.

By October, the Japanese had succeeded in recruiting significant numbers of Timorese civilians, who suffered severe casualties when used in frontal assaults against the Allies. The Portuguese were also being pressured to assist the Japanese, and at least 26 Portuguese civilians were killed in the first six months of the occupation, including local officials and a Catholic priest. On 1 November, the Allied high command approved the issuing of weapons to Portuguese officials, a policy which had previously been carried out on an informal basis. At around the same time, the Japanese ordered all Portuguese civilians to move to a "neutral zone" by 15 November. Those who failed to comply were to be considered accomplices of the Allies. This succeeded only in encouraging the Portuguese to cooperate with the Allies, whom they lobbied to evacuate some 300 women and children.

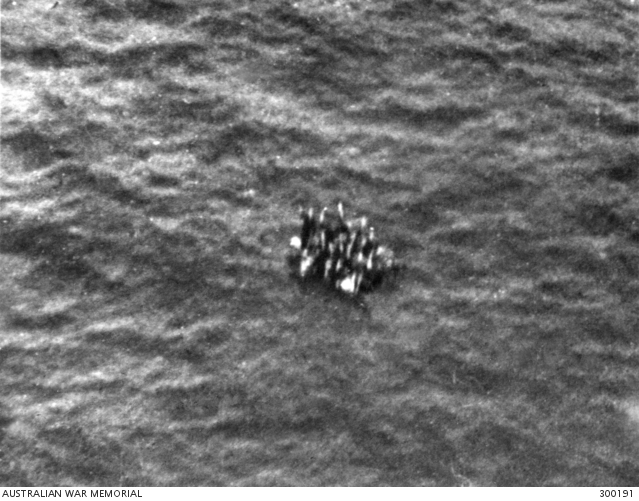
This raft of Armidale survivors was not seen again after this photo was taken on 8 December 1942

Spence was evacuated to Australia on 11 November, and the 2/2nd commander, Major Bernard Callinan was appointed Allied commander in Timor. On the night of 30 November – 1 December, the Royal Australian Navy mounted a major operation to land fresh Dutch troops at Betano, while evacuating 190 Dutch soldiers and 150 Portuguese civilians. The launch HMAS Kuru was used to ferry the passengers between the shore and two corvettes, HMAS Armidale and Castlemaine. However, Armidale—carrying the Dutch reinforcements—was sunk by Japanese aircraft and almost all of those on board were lost. Also during November, the Australian Army's public relations branch arranged to send the Academy Award-winning documentary filmmaker Damien Parer, and a war correspondent named Bill Marien, to Timor. Parer's film, Men of Timor, was later greeted with enthusiasm by audiences in Allied countries. They departed Darwin on 6 November on HMAS Castlemaine, a Bathurst-class corvette and disembarked the following evening, at Betano.

=== Australian withdrawal, December 1942 – February 1943 ===
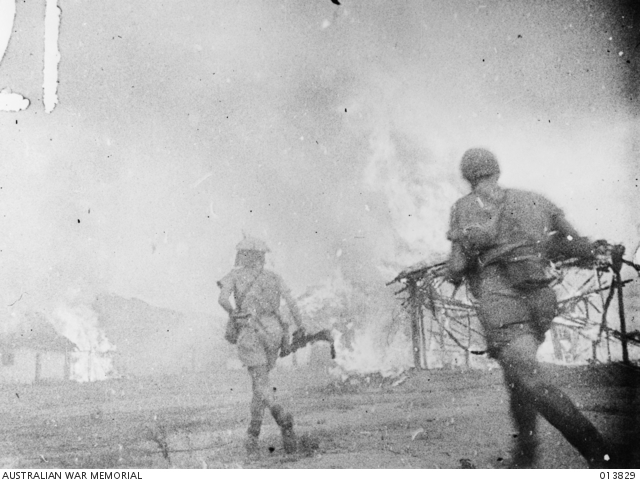
The East Timorese village of Mindelo (Turiscai) is burnt to the ground by Australian guerillas to prevent its use as a Japanese base, 12 December 1942

By the end of 1942, the chances of the Allies re-taking Timor were remote, as there were now 12,000 Japanese troops on the island and the commandos were coming into increasing contact with the enemy. The Australian chiefs of staff estimated that it would take at least three Allied divisions, with strong air and naval support to recapture the island. Indeed, as the Japanese efforts to wear down the Australians and to separate them from their native support became more effective, the commandos had found their operations becoming increasingly untenable. Likewise, with the Australian Army fighting a number of costly battles against the Japanese beachheads around Buna in New Guinea, there were currently insufficient resources to continue operations in Timor. As such from early December Australian operations on Timor would be progressively wound down.

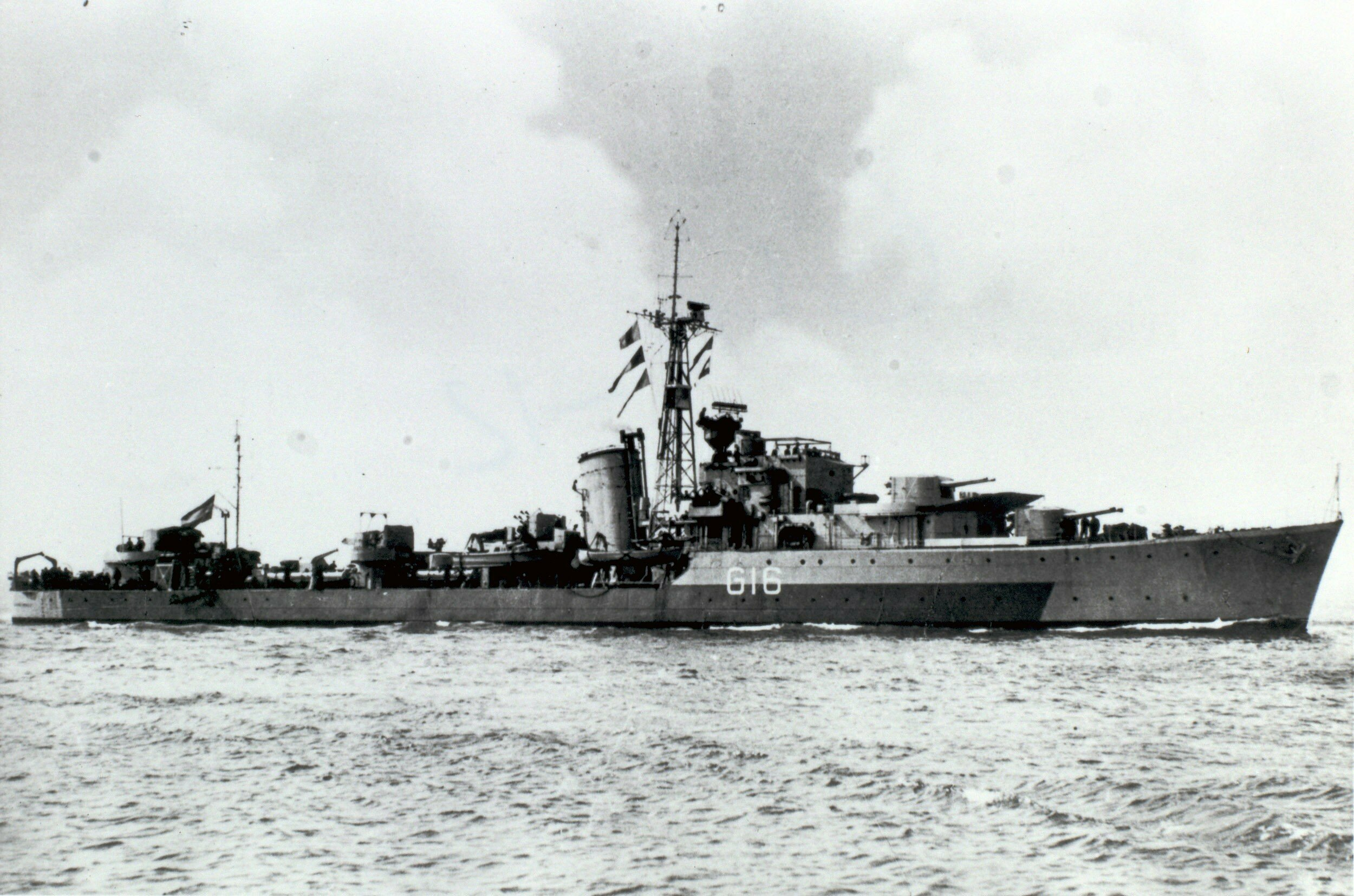
The Dutch Destroyer HNLMS Tjerk Hiddes (1942)

On 9, 15 and 18 December, the remainder of the original Sparrow Force—except for a few officers—was evacuated with Portuguese civilians to Darwin by the Dutch destroyer HNLMS Tjerk Hiddes, under the command of captain W. J. Kruys. Meanwhile, in the first week of January the decision was made to withdraw Lancer Force. On the night of 9/10 January 1943, the bulk of the 2/4th and 50 Portuguese were evacuated by the destroyer HMAS Arunta. A small intelligence team known as S Force was left behind, but its presence was soon detected by the Japanese. With the remnants of Lancer Force, S Force made its way to the eastern tip of Timor, where the Australian-British Z Special Unit was also operating. They were evacuated by the American submarine USS Gudgeon on 10 February. Forty Australian commandos were killed during this phase of the fighting, while 1,500 Japanese were believed to have died.

== Captivity ==
After capitulation on 23 February 1942 those captured were held at the Usapa Besar POW camp. Many officers that were considered "troublemakers" were sent to Java and Changi in August 1942. On 23 September 1942 the rest of Sparrow Force were transported to Surabaya in the hold of an old Chinese freighter, the hellship Dainichi Maru . Sailing via Dili, the ship came under attack from Royal Australian Air Force bombers, and Royal Navy and Dutch submarines. After reaching Surabaya, they travelled by train to Batavia and marched 11 miles (18 km) to Makasuru where the British, Dutch and Australians were separated. The Australians were based around Tandjong Priok initially, while the British joined the RAF prisoners in No. 5 Camp, and the Dutch were sent to another camp.

On 15 October the British was broken up and sent to different parts of South East Asia. Some were held on Java while on 18 October the rest of the battery boarded the freighters Singapore Maru and Oshida Maru to endure a one-week voyage to Singapore. Those Australians that were fit to travel were sent to Singapore during the same period. At Singapore, the Sparrow Force men were marched 15 miles (24 km) to Changi Barracks where they were medically examined and assessed for employment in labour camps throughout South East Asia. Some were sent to work on the Siam-Burma Railway, while others were sent to build a railway on Sumatra or sent to work in labour camps in Japan. Others remained in Singapore at Changi Prison.

Those who travelled to Japan to work in labour camps endured 46 days on the hellships Dainichi Maru and Tofuku Maru. Most casualties were aboard these hellships – with many suffering from disease after disembarking at Moji. In Japan, those who had been transported on the Tofuku Maru were moved by train to Hiraoka where they were held at the Tokyo #2 Detached (Mitsushima) POW Camp. There, they worked to build the Hiraoka Dam. In April 1944, most of the gunners were sent by train to the Tokyo #16 (Showa Denko) POW Camp in Kanose to stoke furnaces in the carbide factory. Those gunners who disembarked the Dainichi Maru joined the Fukuoka #1 POW Camp. This group was later split up and relocated to camps in Moji, Kumamoto, Orio, Ube, Omine and Bibai.

Many died from disease or accidents in labour camps on the Siam-Burma Railway, in Sumatra, Japan, Java, Borneo, and Changi Prison. Later in the war, 120 died when their hellships were sunk by United States Navy submarine en route to Japan from Singapore.

== Aftermath ==
The Sparrow Force guerrillas would become associated with the phrase "you alone do not surrender to us", which were contained in a message to the men of Sparrow Force by the Japanese commander on Timor, Lieutenant General Yuichi Tsuchihashi. Winston Churchill later stated: "they alone did not surrender."

The 2/2nd Independent Company was renamed the 2/2 Commando Squadron and fought in New Guinea and New Britain, ending the war in Rabaul. Of the 81 members of the 2/40th Infantry Battalion evacuated, many soldiers reinforced the Tasmania/Queensland-raised 2/12th Infantry Battalion in the Australian 7th Division, which later fought in the Salamaua-Lae campaign, the Finisterre Range campaign and the Borneo campaign. By the end of the war, "2/2 Commando Squadron could claim to have spent longer in contact with the enemy than any other unit of the Australian Army".

Overall, while the campaign on Timor had little strategic value, the Australian commandos had prevented an entire Japanese division from being used in the earlier phases of the New Guinea campaign while at the same time inflicting a disproportionate level of casualties on them. In contrast to those in Java, Ambon or Rabaul, Australian operations in Timor had been far more successful, even if it was also largely a token effort in the face of overwhelming Japanese strength. Likewise, they had proved that in favorable circumstances, unconventional operations could be both versatile and more economic than conventional operations, for which the resources were not available to the Allies at that time. Regardless, this success came at a high price and included the deaths of between 40,000 and 70,000 Timorese and Portuguese civilians during the Japanese occupation. Total Allied casualties included around 450 killed, while more the 2,000 Japanese were believed to have died in the fighting.

Ultimately, Japanese forces remained in control of Timor until their surrender in August 1945, following the destruction of Hiroshima and Nagasaki. On 5 September 1945, the Japanese commanding officer met Portuguese Governor Manuel de Abreu Ferreira de Carvalho, effectively returning power to him and placing the Japanese forces under Portuguese authority. On 11 September, the Australian Timorforce arrived in Kupang harbor and accepted the surrender of all Japanese forces on Timor from the senior Japanese officer on Timor, Col. Kaida Tatsuichi of the 4th Tank Regiment. The commander of the Timorforce, Brig. Lewis Dyke, a senior diplomat, W. D. Forsyth, and "as many ships as possible" were dispatched to Dili, arriving on 23 September. Ceremonies were then held with Australians, Portuguese and other local residents. Australian troops then supervised the disposal of arms by Japanese work parties before returning to West Timor for the surrender of the commander of the 48th Division, Lt. Gen. Yamada Kunitaro. On 27 September, a Portuguese naval and military force of more than 2,000 troops arrived to an impressive ceremony of welcome by the Timorese people. These troops included three engineering companies along with substantial supplies of food and construction materials for the reconstruction of Timor.

== Equipment ==
Primary weaponry

- 2 × 6-in. Mk XI coastal artillery, taken from store, ex-HMS Hibernia s.n. 2046 & 2047. Gun mounts s.n. AN27 & AN15 ex-HMAS Sydney.
- 6 × Bofors 40 millimetre automatic anti-aircraft artillery
- 4 × Ordnance QF 2-pounder anti-tank guns
- 6 × 3 inch mortar
- 6 × Mk 1 or 2 Bren Guns, came with British Bofors troops
- 55 × Lewis guns,
- 12 x Vickers Machine Guns

Secondary weaponry

- No.1 Mk III* SMLE Lee–Enfield rifles
- 12 x 2 1/2-in. Discharger cups,
- 44 × Thompson submachine gun
- No. 23 Mills bomb grenades
- .455 Webley revolvers (used by officers)

Primary transport

- 8 × Chevrolet 5 tonne trucks/tractors
- 20 × Chevrolet 3 tonne trucks
- 10 × LP1 Universal Carriers
- 4 × Dutch Overvalwagen armoured cars

Secondary transport

- 8 × Chevrolet 1.5 tonne utility trucks
- 3 × Chevrolet sedans
- 4 × motorcycles with sidecars
- 6 × motorcycles

The 2/2nd Ind. Coy. on Portuguese East Timor were more heavily armed, with Bren guns, Thompson SMGs, &c.

== Gallery ==
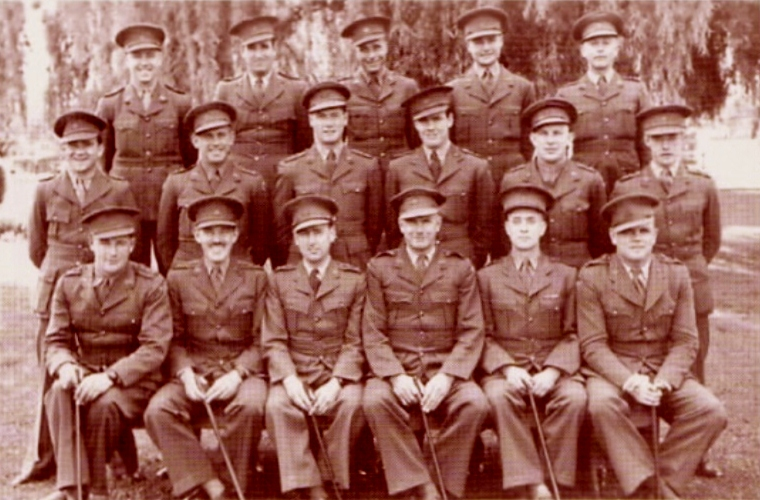
Officers,
2/2 Independent Company,
Wilson's Promontory, Victoria, Australia, 1941.

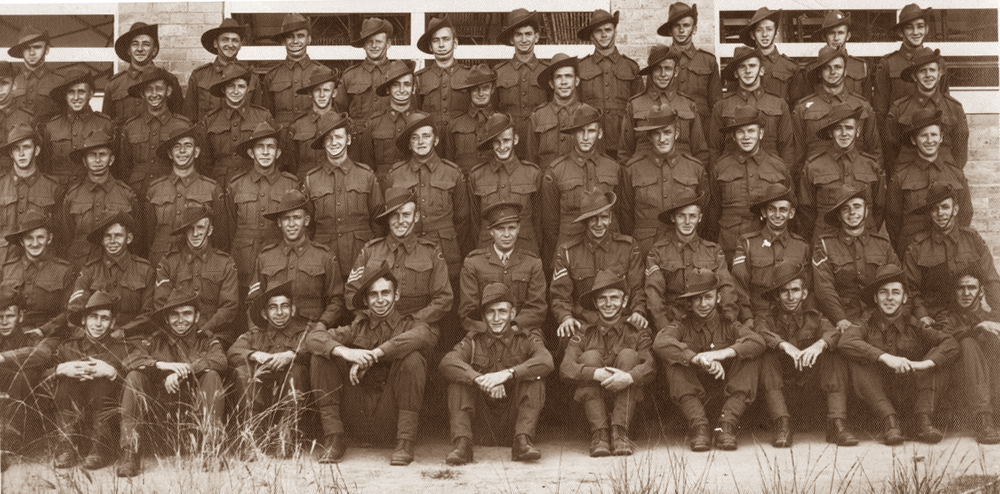
No. 2,
2/11 Field Company RAE,
Redbank, Qld, Australia, 1941.

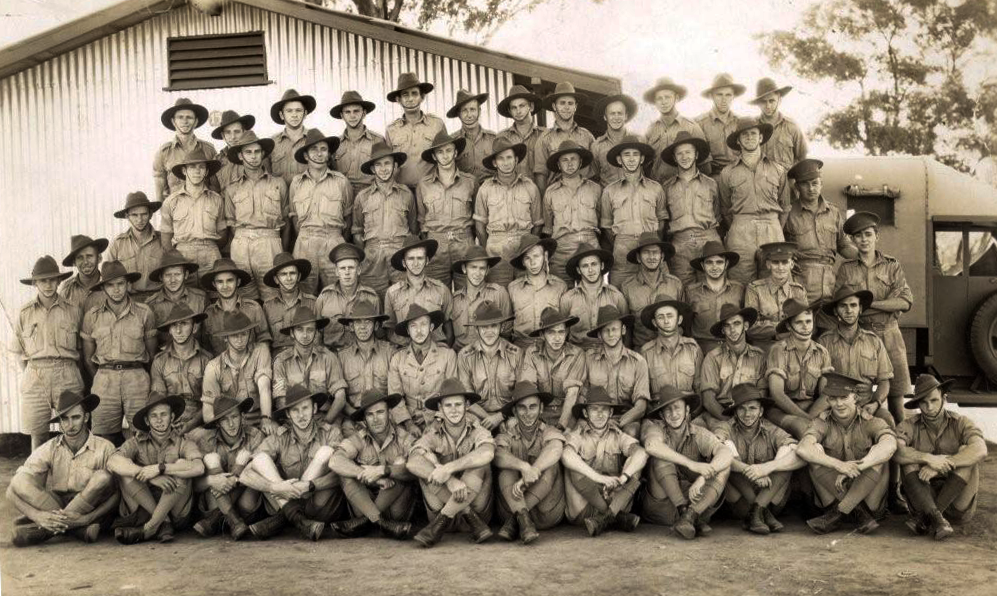
2/12 Field Ambulance RAAMC, Cowra, NSW.

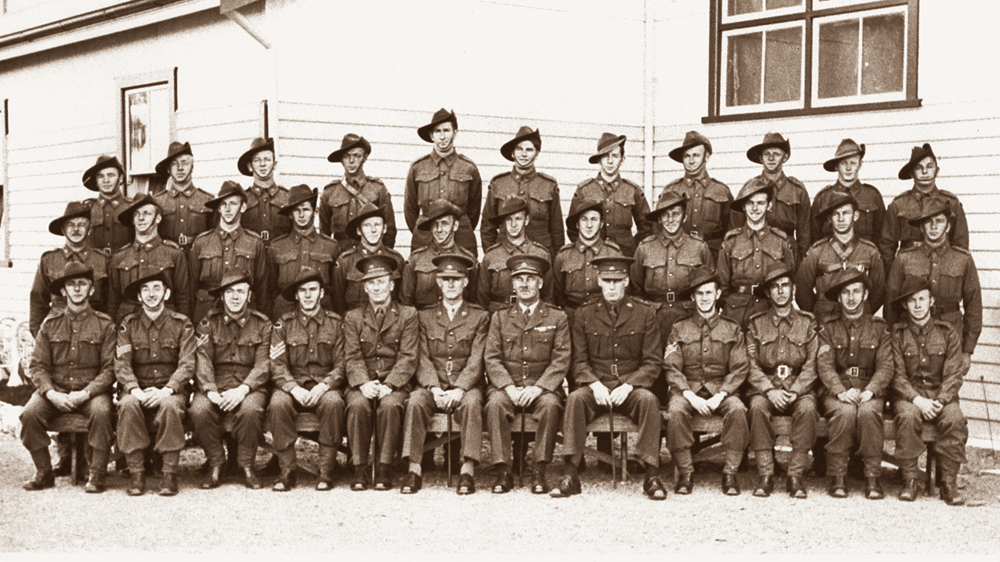
Headquarters Staff,
2/40 Infantry Battalion Brighton, Tas.

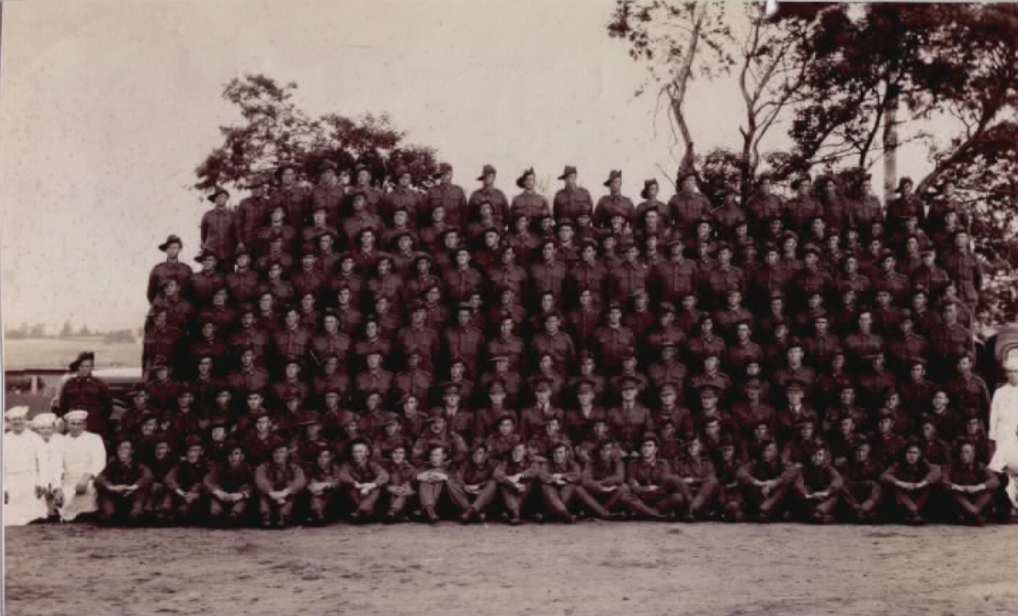
Headquarters Company,
2/40 Infantry Battalion.

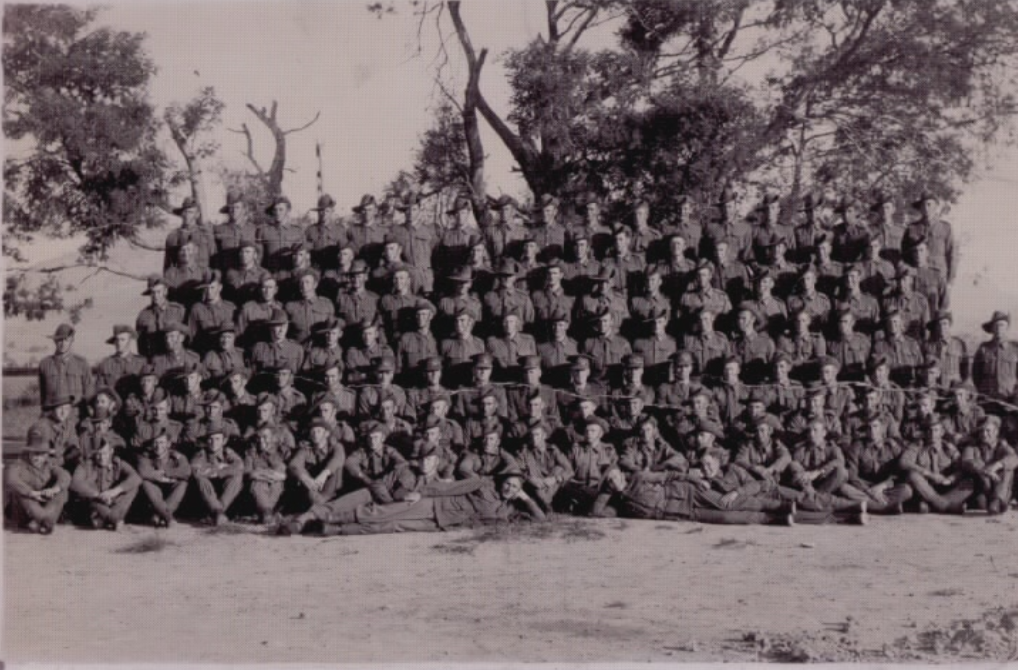
A Company,
2/40 Infantry Battalion.

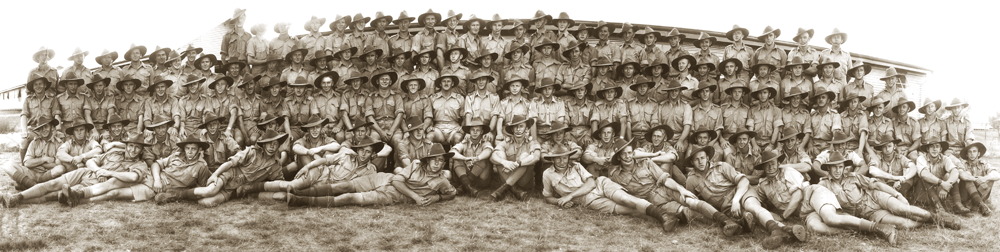
B Company,
2/40 Infantry Battalion.

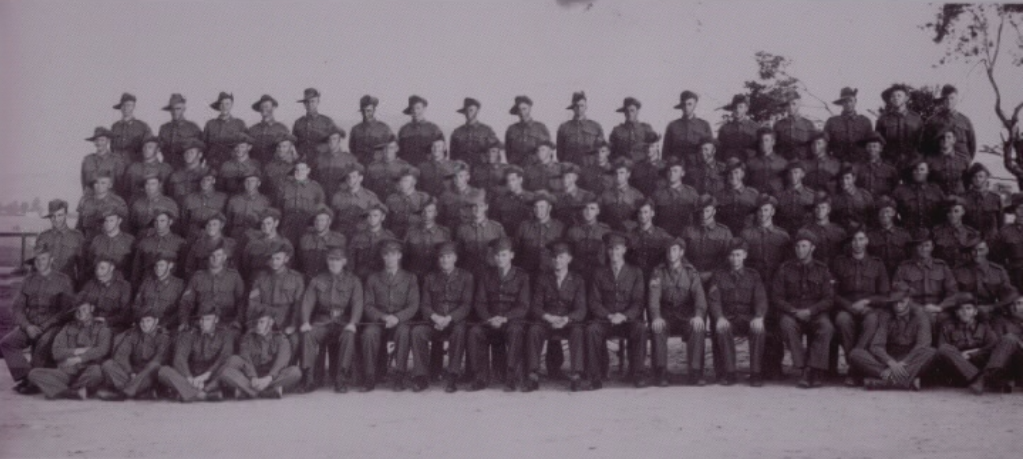
D Company,
2/40 Infantry Battalion.

B Troop,
18 Anti-Tank Battery RAA.

Transport gunners,
79 LAA Bty RA,
Blackpool, 1941.

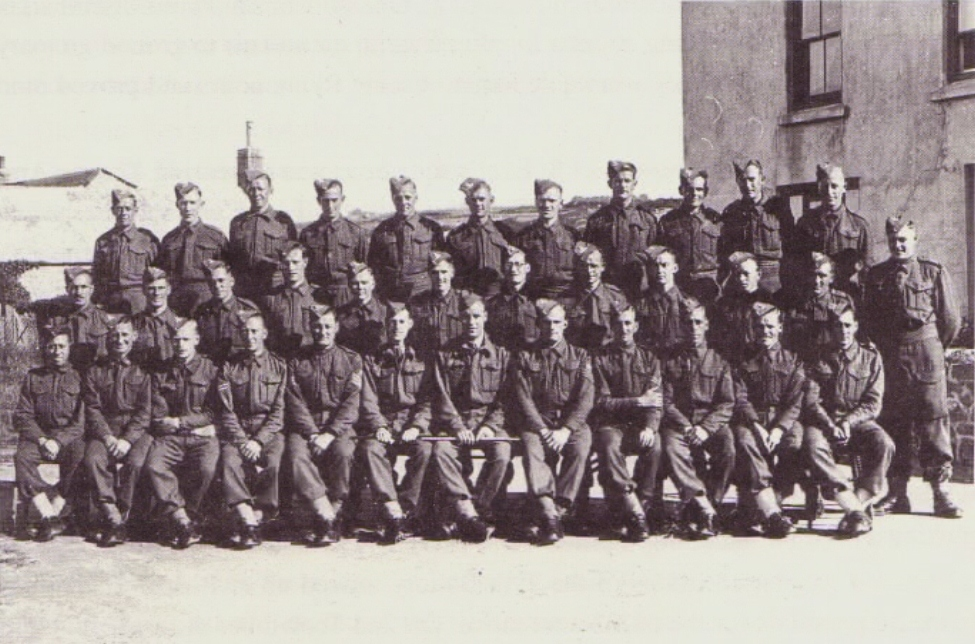
C Troop,
79 LAA Bty RA,
Scilly, 1941.

== Decorations ==
=== Distinguished Service Order ===
Lieutenant Colonel	W.W. Leggatt	2/40 Infantry Battalion
Captain	B.J. Callinan	2/2 Independent Company
Captain	Geoffrey G. Laidlaw	2/2 Independent Company
Major	Alexander Spence	2/2 Independent Company

=== Military Cross ===
Captain	B.J. Callinan	2/2 Independent Company
Lieutenant	C.F.G. McKenzie	2/2 Independent Company
Captain	N.P. Maddern	2/40 Infantry Battalion
Lieutenant	A.H. Samuelson	79th Light Anti-Aircraft Battery
Lieutenant	R.G. Williams	2/40 Infantry Battalion

=== Distinguished Conduct Medal ===
Corporal	J.H. Armstrong	2/40 Infantry Battalion
Private	J.W. Poynton	2/2 Independent Company

=== Military Medal ===
Lance Corporal	H.A. Bailey	2/1 Fortress Signals
Signalman	R.H. Fraser	2/1 Fortress Signals
Warrant Officer	R.G. Hay	2/40 Infantry Battalion
Sapper	K.W. Hickey	2/1 Fortress Company
Sapper	M.C. Livingstone	2/1 Fortress Company
Private	J.K. Powell	2/40 Infantry Battalion

=== Mentioned in dispatches ===
Sergeant	A. Adams	2/12 Field Ambulance RAAMC
Major	R.A. Campbell	2/40 Infantry Battalion
Sergeant	E.J. Cawthorn	2/1 Fortress Signals
Lance Corporal	K. Connors	2/40 Infantry Battalion
Corporal	L.J. Coon	2/12 Field Ambulance RAAMC
Lieutenant	G.F. Stronach	No.2 Section, 2/11 Field Company RAE
Sergeant	R.J. Couch	No.2 Section, 2/11 Field Company RAE
Private	C. Deane	2/12th Field Ambulance RAAMC
Captain	D.W. Gillies	2/12 Field Ambulance RAAMC
Lieutenant	B.H. Gordon	2/40 Infantry Battalion
Captain	A. Hamilton	2/1 Fortress Signals
Corporal	W. Imlach	2/40 Infantry Battalion
Captain	N.H. Johnston	2/40 Infantry Battalion
Lance Corporal	T.N. Kay	2/1 Fortress Company
Sergeant	M.A. Kerkham	2/40 Infantry Battalion
Corporal	B.E. Martin	2/12 Field Ambulance RAAMC|
Sergeant	R.W. Martin	2/40 Infantry Battalion
Warrant Officer	A.H. McInnes	2/40 Infantry Battalion
Sergeant	H.R. Mercer	2/12 Field Ambulance RAAMC
Captain	L.O.S. Poidevin	2/12 Field Ambulance RAAMC
Captain	N.H. Roff	2/40 Infantry Battalion
Major	R.H. Stevens	2/12 Field Ambulance RAAMC
Captain	R.R. Baldwin (twice)	2/2 Independent Company
Captain	B.J. Callinan	2/2 Independent Company
Corporal	K.S. Curran	2/2 Independent Company
Lance Sergeant	J.R. Denman	2/2 Independent Company
Lieutenant	D. St. A. Dexter	2/2 Independent Company
Captain	C.R. Dunkley	2/2 Independent Company
Lance Corporal	R.E. Ewan	2/2 Independent Company
Lance Corporal	J.F. Fowler	2/2 Independent Company
Corporal	J.T. Haire	2/2 Independent Company
Corporal	E. Hodgson	2/2 Independent Company
Private	W.I. Holley	2/2 Independent Company
Lance Corporal	R. Johnson	2/2 Independent Company
Private	J. Keenahan	2/2 Independent Company
Lance Corporal	B.C. Langridge	2/2 Independent Company
Corporal	E. Loud	2/2 Independent Company
Private	M.L. Loveless	2/2 Independent Company
Private	C.R. Martin	2/2 Independent Company
Lance Sergeant	H.J. Morgan	2/2 Independent Company
Captain	T.G. Nisbet	2/2 Independent Company
Lance Sergeant	J.S. O’Brien	2/2 Independent Company
Private	R.N. Parry	2/2 Independent Company
Sergeant	F.A. Press	2/2 Independent Company
Lieutenant	J.A. Rose	2/2 Independent Company
Private	N.D. Scott	2/2 Independent Company
Corporal	J. Servante	2/2 Independent Company
Signaller	M.A.M. Smith	2/2 Independent Company
Corporal	G.A. Stanley	2/2 Independent Company
Captain	D.K. Turton	2/2 Independent Company
Corporal	A.H.K. Wray	2/2 Independent Company

=== Dutch Bronze Cross ===
Lieutenant	C.F.G. McKenzie	2/2 Independent Company
Private	J.W. Poynton	2/2 Independent Company
