= 2/12th Field Ambulance =

Australian military medical unit

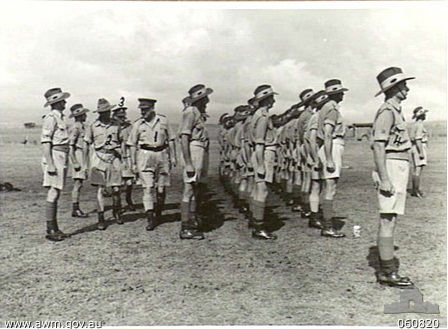
- Members of the 2/12th Field Ambulance during a parade in November 1943
- Active: 1940–46
- Country: Australia
- Branch: Australian Army
- Type: Medical
- Size: ~ 262 personnel all ranks
- Nickname(s): "2/12th Pioneers"

Insignia
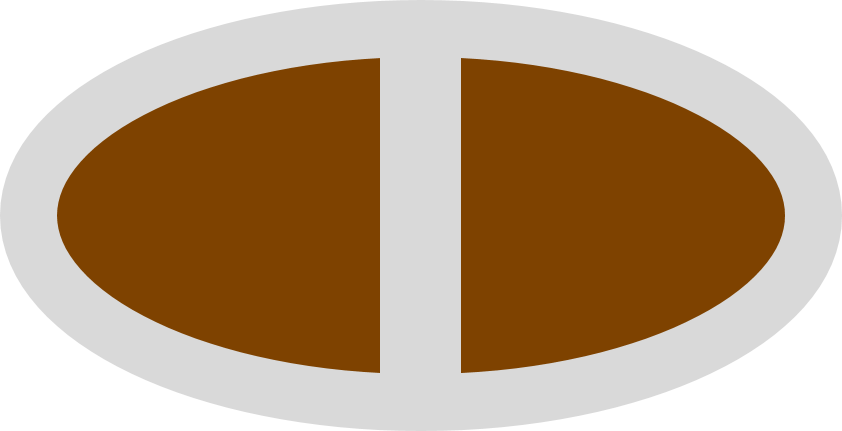
- Unit colour patch

The 2/12th Field Ambulance was an Australian military unit of the Second Australian Imperial Force, serving during World War II. During their six years of service, over 200 soldiers were killed, the highest figure for a non-combatant unit in Australian history. The majority of the unit's casualties were suffered during the sinking of the hospital ship Centaur in May 1943. During the war, the 2/12th deployed personnel in support of Australian combat operations against the Japanese on Ambon, Timor and in Borneo before being disbanded in 1946.

== History ==
The 2/12th was founded at Sydney Showground on 22 November 1940. Consisting of a headquarters company and two deployable companies, the unit consisted of 12 officers and 250 soldiers and had the capacity to provide medical support at brigade-level including battlefield casualty collection and initial wound treatment. Under the command of Lieutenant Colonel Nathaniel Barton, who had previously served as commanding officer of the 6th Light Horse Regiment, the unit was attached to the 23rd Infantry Brigade, 8th Division. Most of the recruits were from rural New South Wales. During their training in the Northern Territory, the members of the 2/12th provided medical support for the 23rd Brigade, participated in the construction of five small medical hospitals, and assisted sappers and pioneer assault units, earning the unit the nickname "2/12th Pioneers".

Following the beginning of the Pacific War, 50 members of the 2/12th were each attached to Gull Force and Sparrow Force, and sent to defend the islands of Ambon and Timor respectively. All of the members of the 2/12th serving with Gull Force were captured or killed by the Japanese on 1 February 1942, with many dying as prisoners of war on Ambon or Hainan. Many of those serving with Sparrow Force were also captured.

After this, the half-strength unit was reinforced and rebuilt in Darwin, where the unit remained until January 1943, continuing to support the 23rd Brigade. After being relieved by the 2/13th Field Ambulance, the 2/12th moved to the Wollongong–Illawarra area, to support the 9th Brigade while more personnel were posted into the unit from the 1st Division's medical units to bring it up to full strength. Finally, the unit was ready to deploy overseas and on 10 May 1943, the 195 members of the 2/12th boarded hospital ship Centaur to be transported to New Guinea, where they were scheduled to relieve the 3rd Field Ambulance in Port Moresby. On 14 May 1943, at 4:00 a.m., Centaur was torpedoed by Japanese submarine I-177, and sank in less than three minutes. Of the 332 aboard, there were only 64 survivors, including 15 members of the 2/12th. It was 13 hours before they were rescued by USS Mugford.

The survivors were reinforced by men from the 4th Light Field Ambulance, and was the 2/12th briefly attached to the 1st Division around Belgownie before being attached at corps-level to I Corps on the Atherton Tablelands in Queensland, arriving there in November 1943. In early 1944, the unit re-established itself at Wongabel in preparation for deployment to New Guinea where Australian forces were fighting around the Huon Peninsula. In the end, the unit was not deployed there and had to wait until 1945 before it would be sent overseas again, when it was committed to the Borneo campaign. In February, the unit was despatched to Morotai from where it would eventually detach elements to Tarakan, Lutong, and Kuching to support the 26th and 20th Brigades, both part of the 9th Division. The unit was disbanded in 1946, having served past the war's end, working with the retrieval and care of Allied prisoners of war. During the war, according to author Graham McKenzie-Smith, the unit had the "highest casualty rate of a non-combatant unit in the Australian Army".

== See also ==
- 2/21st Battalion (Australia)

== Bibliography ==
- McKenzie-Smith, Graham (March 2010). "The Unluckiest Unit in the Second AIF? 2/12th Field Ambulance AAMC". Sabretache. LI (1). Military Historical Society of Australia: 17–20. ISSN 0048-8933.
- Pearn, John (2002). "The 2/12 Australian Field Ambulance". ADF Health. 3 (1): 40–42. ISSN 1443-1033. Archived from the original on 5 April 2007.
- Walker, Allan Seymour (1962). Middle East and Far East. Australia in the War of 1939–1945. Series 5 – Medical, Volume II (Reprinted ed.). Canberra, Australian Capital Territory: Australian War Memorial. OCLC 6162767.
