= David Ross (aviator) =

British Consul to Portuguese Timor
- In office 1941–1942
- Monarch: George VI

Personal details
- Born: 15 March 1902 Melbourne, Victoria
- Died: 12 June 1984 (aged 82) Perth, Western Australia
- Resting place: Karrakatta Cemetery

Military service
- Allegiance: Australia
- Branch/service: Royal Australian Navy; Royal Australian Air Force
- Years of service: 1915–1931 c. 1943–1946
- Rank: Group Captain
- Battles/wars: Second World War; Battle of Timor

David Ross (15 March 1902 – 12 June 1984) was an Australian aviator and intelligence officer. He was notably the consul of the British Empire to Portuguese Timor during the Second World War. Later in life he served as Regional Director of Civil Aviation for Western Australia.

== Early life and career ==
Ross was born in Australia on 15 March 1902. At the age of 13 he received a scholarship opportunity to join the Royal Australian Navy, which he accepted. During the-then ongoing First World War he trained with the Royal Australian Navy at Jervis Bay. Following the war Ross was sent to England to study the field of naval aviation, after which he was deployed to Point Cook. In 1931 Ross transferred out of the armed forces and into the civil aviation branch of the Department of Defence, where he worked with Imperial Airways and Qantas to establish air routes between Australia, Singapore, and London.

=== Consul ===
Following the outbreak of the Second World War in Europe and rising tensions with the Japanese Empire in the Pacific, the Australian government's External Affairs Department sent Ross to Portuguese Timor to shore up the British Empire's relationship with Portugal. While serving as consul, Ross also worked with Qantas to explore the possibility of establishing a seaplane route between Australia and Dili. When still-neutral Portuguese Timor was invaded in February 1942 and occupied by a Japanese army in pursuit of retreating British and Dutch forces, Ross was taken prisoner. Despite the capture of Dili, the Japanese still faced determined Anglo-Dutch forces in the mountains of Timor. Hoping to negotiate their surrender, Colonel Sadashichi Doi of the Japanese 38th Division sent Ross with a letter of demands to Sparrow Force, a detachment of Australian soldiers who had withdrawn to defensive positions in the mountains. The Japanese demands were not well received, and seeing that further hostilities were inevitable, Ross issued letters of credit to the allied soldiers offering any civilians who assisted them financial compensation by the British Empire; this in turn allowed allied soldiers to buy supplies on credit. In addition, Ross gave the allied forces detailed information about the Japanese defences around Dili. Ross then returned to Dili, where he was imprisoned for a second time. After several months of further skirmishes between the Japanese and the allied forces, Ross was again sent to the allied lines to relay the Japanese demands for an allied surrender. He was rebuffed again, but this time declined to return to Japanese custody and stayed with a detachment of Australians. On 16 July Ross was evacuated by HMAS Kuru to Australia, where he described before the Advisory War Council the situation on Timor. He then became a flight coordinator for the Royal Australian Air Force, at one point coordinating the movements of over one hundred Douglas DC-3 transport aircraft.

After the war Ross was appointed Regional Director of Civil Aviation for Western Australia, a position he held from 1948 until his retirement in 1964.
