= Winnie the War Winner =

The radio set known as "Winnie the War Winner" on display in the Australian War Memorial.

Winnie the War Winner was a radio set built by Sparrow Force during the Battle of Timor in 1942. The radio re-established contact between Sparrow Force and the Australian Army in Darwin on 19 April 1942. At the time, the Allies believed that Sparrow Force had been captured by the Japanese Army. By then, Sparrow Force had fought a guerrilla campaign isolated from Australia for 60 days.

The radio is currently on display in the Australian War Memorial in Canberra.

== Design ==
The radio was built by Captain George Parker, Corporal John (Jack) Sargent, Corporal John Donovan, Signaller Max (Joe) Loveless and Signalman Keith Richards. In civil life, Loveless had been a technician with 7ZL, a radio station in Hobart. The signallers built the radio using salvaged equipment, including the power pack from a Dutch transmitter, 60 ft of aerial wire, a broken commercial medium-wave receiving set, and a transmitter from a broken 109 set. To power the equipment, a generator, taken from an old car, charged the batteries. The generator was operated by four natives turning handles attached to a four-foot diameter wheel, which drove a smaller 18-inch wheel connected by a rope loop. The smaller wheel ran the generator, which charged the batteries.

== Contact ==
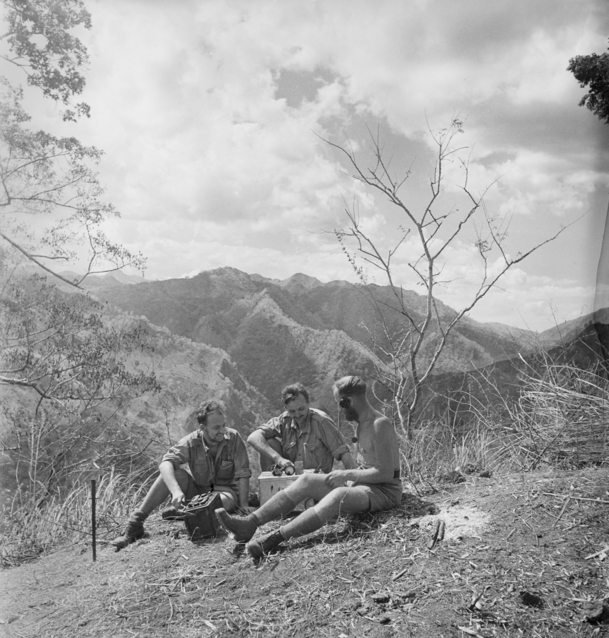
Signaller Keith Richards, Corporal John Donovan and Sergeant Jack Sargeant (left to right), from the Australian 2/2nd Independent Company, using a radio on a mountain top in Japanese-occupied Timor, in about November 1942.

The first communication between Sparrow Force and Northern Force Headquarters in Darwin was:

Sparrow Force: "Sparrow Force Timor calling Northern Force Headquarters Darwin. Anyone there, over?"
Northern Force Headquarters: "Who are you?"
Sparrow Force: "Jack Sargeant."
Northern Force Headquarters: "Do you know George Parker?"
Sparrow Force: "Yes, he is with us."
Northern Force Headquarters: "What is his rank? Answer immediately."
Sparrow Force: "Captain."
Northern Force Headquarters: "Is he there? Bring him to the transmitter. (Pause.) What is the street number of your house?"
Sparrow Force: "94."
Northern Force Headquarters: "What is your wife’s name, Jack?"
Sparrow Force: "Kathleen."
Northern Force Headquarters: "This is Northern Force Headquarters. Sparrow Force, what is your situation?"
Sparrow Force: "Force intact. Still fighting. Badly need boots, quinine, money, and Tommy-gun ammunition."
Northern Force Headquarters: "Will action immediately."

== The Men of Timor ==
In late 1942, Army public relations sent the Academy Award winning filmmaker Damien Parer, and war correspondent Bill Marien to Timor, to record the efforts of the Australian commandos. His film, Men of Timor, was greeted with enthusiasm by Australian audiences.

There are several discrepancies between the re-inaction of the first communication on 19 April 1942 and official accounts. Jack Sargeant's wife's name was not "Joan" as the film recounts but rather Kathleen. This change was made to protect her identity.
