= William Leggatt =

Australian politician, lawyer and military officer

Lieutenant Colonel Sir William Leggatt DSO, MC, ED
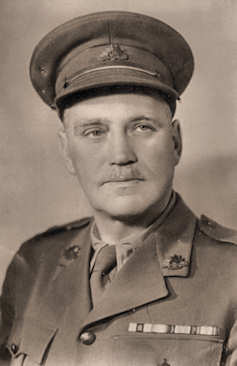

Member of the Victorian Legislative Assembly for Mornington
- In office 8 November 1947 – 3 February 1956
- Preceded by: Alfred Kirton
- Succeeded by: Roberts Dunstan

Personal details
- Born: William Watt Leggatt; 23 December 1894 Malekula, New Hebrides
- Died: 27 November 1968 (aged 73) Heidelberg, Victoria, Australia
- Resting place: Springvale Botanical Cemetery
- Party: Liberal and Country Party
- Spouse: Dorothy Meares Andrews (m. 1926)
- Education: University of Melbourne
- Profession: Barrister and solicitor

Military service
- Allegiance: Australia
- Branch/service: Australian Imperial Force; Citizens Military Force
- Years of service: 1915–1919; 1934–1946
- Rank: Lieutenant Colonel
- Commands: Sparrow Force; 2/40th Battalion
- Battles/wars: First World War; Second World War
- Awards: Knight Bachelor; Distinguished Service Order; Military Cross; Mentioned in Despatches (2)

Sir William Watt Leggatt, DSO, MC, ED (23 December 1894 – 27 November 1968) was an Australian soldier, lawyer and politician. He served as commanding officer of the 2/40th Battalion and later Sparrow Force during the Second World War, fighting in Timor against the Japanese invasion in 1942. He was captured by the Japanese and sent to Changi Prison in Singapore. Following the war, he was based in Melbourne in charge of war crimes investigation until 1946. In 1948 he was elected to the Victorian parliament. He died in 1968 and was accorded a state funeral.

== See also ==
- Battle of Timor

Victorian Legislative Assembly
Preceded by Alfred Kirton	Member for Mornington; 1947–1956	Succeeded by Roberts Dunstan
Diplomatic posts
Preceded by John Lienhop	Agent-General for Victoria; 1956–1964	Succeeded by Horace Petty
