= Bernard Callinan =

Australian Army officer and businessman

Sir Bernard Callinan
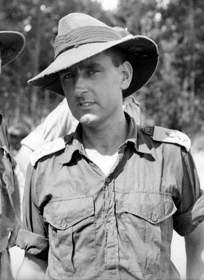
- Callinan as a lieutenant colonel in command of the 26th Battalion, Bougainville, 1945
- Born: 2 February 1913; Melbourne, Victoria
- Died: 20 July 1995 (aged 82); Melbourne, Victoria
- Military career
- Allegiance: Australia
- Branch: Australian Army
- Service years: 1940–1946; 1948–1951
- Rank: Lieutenant Colonel
- Commands: 2/2nd Independent Company; 26th Infantry Battalion; 58/32nd Infantry Battalion
- Conflicts: Second World War; Battle of Timor; New Guinea campaign; Bougainville campaign
- Awards: Distinguished Service Order; Military Cross; Mentioned in Despatches
- Other work: President, Melbourne Cricket Club; President, Institute of Engineers; Chairman, GHD

Sir Bernard James Callinan, AC, CBE, DSO, MC (2 February 1913 – 20 July 1995) was an Australian soldier, civil engineer, businessman, and sport administrator.

== Early life ==
Born in Melbourne on 2 February 1913, after attending St Kevin's College Callinan completed a Bachelor of Civil Engineering at the University of Melbourne. Upon graduating in 1935, he joined the embryonic consulting practice of Gordon Gutteridge, which became Gutteridge, Haskins and Davey a few years later and is now known as GHD.

== Military service ==
Callinan was commissioned as a lieutenant in the Citizens Military Force in June 1940, being appointed into the Royal Australian Engineers. In March 1941, he volunteered for overseas service and joined the Second Australian Imperial Force, taking up a posting as an instructor at the Demolitions Wing, at the 7th Infantry Training Centre. He was promoted to captain in July 1941, and subsequently posted as the second-in-command to the 2/2nd Independent Company, deploying with them to Timor as part of Sparrow Force in December 1941. He subsequently led the commandos during their campaign on the island and in July 1942 was temporarily promoted to major.

Upon returning to Australia, his promotion to major was confirmed and he served on the headquarters of the First Army as a staff officer before taking up a posting as second-in-command of the 31st/51st Battalion at Merauke in November 1943. In early 1945, he was promoted to lieutenant colonel and assumed command of the 26th Battalion, leading them through the Bougainville Campaign. In February 1946, he was discharged from the 2nd AIF, but later returned to the Citizen Military Forces and commanded the 58th/32nd Infantry Battalion, commanding it from 1948 to 1951. For his wartime service he was awarded the Distinguished Service Order and Military Cross for outstanding leadership and gallantry. He was also Mentioned in Despatches.

== Professional career ==
Returning to GHD from service in World War 2, Callinan developed the practice in Victoria and Tasmania, creating a vibrant and enthusiastic team with a reputation for efficiency and integrity. Callinan was a great believer in diversifying the scope of work that GHD performed, particularly in urban planning. He studied this subject at Melbourne University part-time and topped his class with honours. This enabled GHD to add another service to its offering and grow its relationships with local government clients. He was appointed chairman and managing director of the company in 1971 and received a Commander of the Order of the British Empire for his services to engineering. The following year he was presented with the Peter Nicol Russell Memorial Medal from the Institution of Engineers Australia. In 1977 he was knighted for services to engineering and retired from GHD in 1978, after 44 years of service. Callinan led the company through a period of rapid expansion, as it grew to 500 employees with offices around Australia and began to establish a global footprint.

Callinan held many positions in the commercial field, including director of CSR Ltd, director of British Petroleum Company of Australia, chairman of the new Federal Parliament House Construction Authority, commissioner of the Australian Broadcasting Corporation and the State Electricity Commission of Victoria (SEC), deputy chancellor of La Trobe University and president of the Institute of Engineers Australia. From 1963 he served as Commissioner of the SEC Victoria.

== Sport administration ==
Callinan joined the Melbourne Cricket Club (MCC) committee in 1966 and served as president from 1980 to 1985. He fought to retain the Victorian Football League (VFL) grand final at the Melbourne Cricket Ground (MCG), and was a long-serving Victorian Amateur Football Association (VAFA) Patron-in-Chief.

== Later life ==
He died in 1995. His five children and his wife, Naomi, survived him.
