= Usapa Besar =

Military camp

Coordinates: 10.132036°S 123.669425°E

Usapa Besar was a military camp built by Sparrow Force in the defence of Timor in 1942. After capitulation, the Japanese Army converted the camp to hold Sparrow Force as prisoners of war.
