= HMAS Kuru =

Australian patrol boat

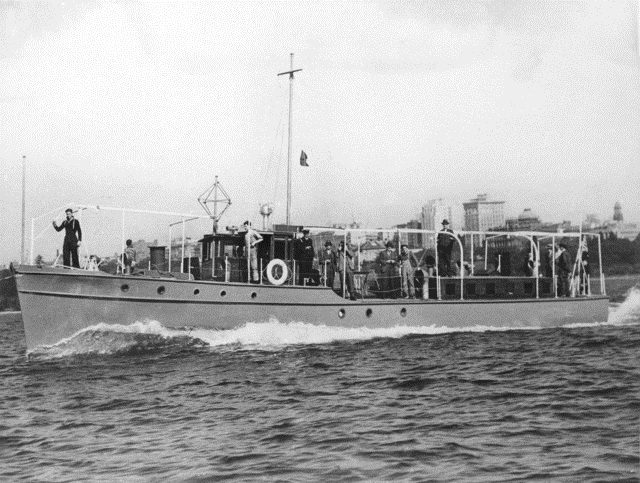
- Kuru in Sydney Harbour, 1938

History

Australia
- Name: Kuru
- Launched: 1938
- Acquired: from Northern Territory Patrol Service
- Commissioned: December 1941
- Honours and awards: Battle honours: Darwin 1942–43; Pacific 1943
- Fate: Damaged beyond repair, October 1943

General characteristics
- Type: Auxiliary patrol boat
- Length: 75 ft (23 m)
- Propulsion: Diesel engine
- Speed: 9 knots (17 km/h; 10 mph)
- Complement: 21
- Armament: NTPS: 1 × 3-pounder gun; RAN: 1 × Oerlikon 20 mm cannon; 1 × .50 cal. machine gun; Several light machine guns

HMAS Kuru was an auxiliary patrol boat operated by the Royal Australian Navy (RAN) during World War II. Constructed in 1938 for the Northern Territory Patrol Service, Kuru was requisitioned by the RAN following the Japanese declaration of war in December 1941. The ship operated from Darwin and was one of the vessels used to keep Allied troops in Timor resupplied following the Japanese invasion. Kuru operated until 1943, when she was damaged beyond repair in an accident.

== Design and construction ==
Kuru was built at Balmain, New South Wales in 1938 for the Northern Territory Patrol Service and was used to counter poaching by Japanese fishermen. She was 23 metres (75 ft 6 in) long, had a maximum speed of 9 knots (17 km/h; 10 mph), and was armed with a single three-pounder gun.

In RAN service, her armament was increased to an Oerlikon 20 mm cannon, a 0.50 calibre M2 Browning machine gun, and several lighter machine guns.

== Operational history ==
Following the outbreak of the Pacific War, Kuru was commissioned into the RAN in December 1941 as an auxiliary patrol boat. HMAS Kuru played an important role in the Battle of Timor from May 1942 and completed numerous supply trips to the island.

In late November 1942, the RAN was called on to evacuate the commandos of the 2/2nd Independent Company after ten months of guerilla warfare against the Japanese in Timor (an evacuation attempt in September had failed when the destroyer HMAS Voyager grounded, then was destroyed by Japanese aircraft), a contingent of Dutch troops, and over 100 Portuguese civilians, while delivering a relief contingent of Royal Netherlands East Indies Army and Australian soldiers. Kuru and the Bathurst-class corvettes Armidale and Castlemaine were assigned to the operation: on 30 November Kuru was to reach Betano Bay two hours before the other ships, offload her cargo, and take on the civilians, then meet the corvettes as they arrived and shuttle the fresh troops ashore, with personnel evacuated on return trips. Kuru sailed early on 29 November, and arrived without incident. After offloading the supplies and taking on 70 women and children, the vessel waited for Armidale and Castlemaine to arrive, but after they failed to appear by 02:00 the next morning, sailed for Darwin. The corvettes, which had been delayed by air attacks, found Kuru after dawn, and the civilians were transferred to Castlemaine, with Armidale and Kuru ordered to return by separate routes and attempt the operation again that night. During the day, Kuru was attacked by Japanese aircraft; despite the dropping of over 260 bombs, the vessel suffered only minor damage. At 20:00, the operation was called off as Japanese cruisers had been sighted in the area, and Kuru returned to Darwin on 3 December. Armidale was not so lucky; she was attacked and sunk by Japanese aircraft on 1 December.

Following the evacuation of Timor, Kuru operated in Northern Australian waters and rescued the survivors of HMAS Patricia Cam in January 1943.

Kuru was damaged beyond repair by an accident in October 1943.

Kuru was awarded the battle honours "Darwin 1942–43" and "Pacific 1942" for her wartime service.
