= 23rd Brigade (Australia) =

Infantry brigade of the Australian Army during World War II

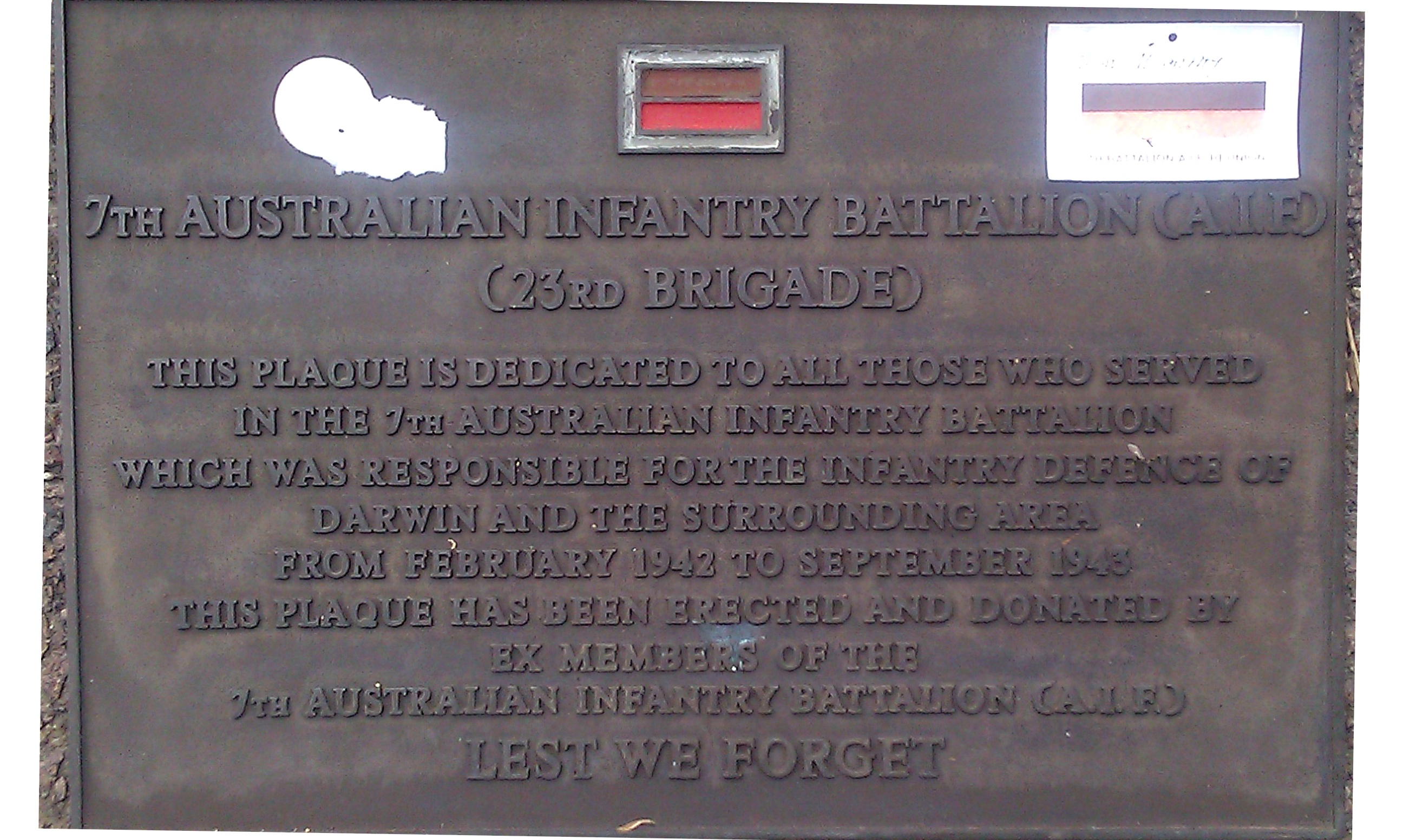
- A memorial plaque for the 23rd Brigade in Bicentennial Park, Darwin
- Active: 1940–1946
- Country: Australia
- Branch: Australian Army
- Type: Infantry
- Size: ~3,500 men
- Part of: 8th Division (1940–42); 12th Division (1942–43); 3rd Division (1943–46)
- Engagements: Second World War: Battle of Ambon; Battle of Rabaul (1942); Battle of Timor; Bougainville campaign

Commanders
- Notable commanders: Arnold Potts

Insignia
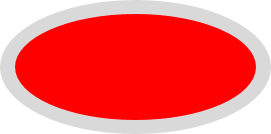
- Unit colour patch

The 23rd Brigade was a brigade of the Australian Army. It was briefly raised in 1912 as a Militia formation providing training as part of the compulsory training scheme. Later, it was re-formed in July 1940 for service during the Second World War, the brigade was initially a formation of the Second Australian Imperial Force assigned to the 8th Division; however, after its sub units were captured by the Japanese in 1942 it was reformed with Militia battalions and was mainly used in a garrison role around Darwin, in the Northern Territory, until late in the war when it was committed to the fighting against the Japanese on Bougainville. It was disbanded in 1946.

== History ==
=== Early formation ===
The 23rd Brigade briefly existed as Militia brigade that was partially formed in 1912, following the introduction of the compulsory training scheme. At this time, it was assigned to the 6th Military District. The brigade's constituent units were spread across various locations in Tasmania including Lyell, Zeehan, Burnie, Devonport, Deloraine, Beaconsfield, Launceston, Scottsdale, Hobart and Huon. The brigade consisted of four infantry battalions, numbered consecutively as the 90th, 91st, 92nd and 93rd. The formation was short lived, and was not raised as part of the First Australian Imperial Force (AIF) during the First World War. It remained on the order of battle as a Militia formation during the war, but was not re-raised in the interwar years when the Militia was reorganised to replicate the numerical designations of the AIF in 1921.

=== Second World War ===
The brigade was re-formed in July 1940 at Seymour, Victoria, for service during the Second World War, the 23rd Brigade was initially raised as a unit of the Second Australian Imperial Force, attached to the 8th Division. Upon formation it consisted of three infantry battalions—the 2/21st, 2/22nd and 2/40th Battalions—although later both a pioneer (initially, the 2/3rd but then later the 2/4th) and a machine gun battalion (the 2/4th) were added to its establishment. These units were drawn from Victoria and Tasmania. The brigade's first commander was Brigadier Edmund Lind.

In August 1940, the brigade concentrated around Bonegilla. When the 8th Division was sent to Malaya in early 1941, the 23rd Brigade remained in Australia. In March and April 1941, it deployed to Darwin until Japanese intentions became clearer. Nevertheless, ultimately its subunits experienced the same fate that befell the rest of the division. Broken up and sent piecemeal to reinforce the garrisons at Rabaul, Ambon and on Timor, the 2/21st, 2/22nd and 2/40th Battalions were all eventually destroyed or captured by the Japanese in early 1942. Outnumbered and lacking sufficient air and artillery support, these units were quickly overwhelmed. While some members were able to evade capture and eventually rejoined Australian forces in New Guinea, most were captured. Many died in Japanese captivity. The 2/4th Machine Gun Battalion was also hastily deployed, reinforcing the 8th Division in Singapore where it too was eventually captured.

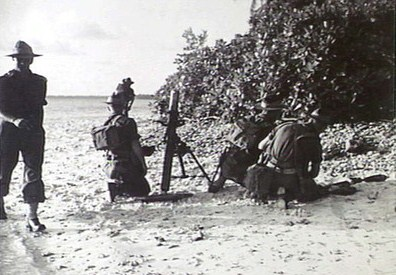
A 27th Battalion mortar team during a training exercise in December 1944

While its constituent battalions were deployed, the brigade's headquarters remained intact in Darwin, and consequently it was reinforced with replacement units from the Militia, beginning in December 1941. The brigade's constituent units initially included the 43rd Battalion and the 27th Battalion, while the 19th Machine Gun Regiment arrived to replace the 2/4th in January 1942. In March 1942, Brigadier Ivan Dougherty assumed command of the brigade which was assigned to the 12th Division (Northern Territory Force). Later, the 8th Battalion was also assigned to the 23rd Brigade. Having been responsible for the forward defensive area around Darwin initially, in March 1942, the brigade re-deployed to Brookings Creek when the 3rd Brigade arrived, occupying a defensive position in depth. At this time it was assigned a US artillery regiment—the 147th—in support, and consisted of the 7th, 8th and 43rd Battalions. A reorganisation in mid-1942 saw the brigade move to Howard Springs, Northern Territory. Throughout 1942 and 1943, the brigade remained in the Northern Territory, undertaking defensive duties. There were several moves during this time, and the brigade's assigned units varied.

In September 1943, the 23rd Brigade was relieved by the 12th. Brigade headquarters, along with the 7th and 8th Battalions were redeployed to Watsonia, Victoria, and then sent to the Atherton Tablelands in Queensland, where the 27th Battalion rejoined the brigade. There, the 23rd formed part of the 3rd Division and undertook training prior to deployment overseas.

In April 1944, the brigade deployed to Lae, in New Guinea, where they were assigned to the 11th Division. Training was undertaken at Bulolo, before the brigade was reassigned to the 3rd Division in July. Later in the year, under the command of Brigadier Arnold Potts, the brigade took part in the Bougainville campaign as part of II Corps. Initially, they were used in a static role, garrisoning the Outer Islands, which they took control of from the US 93rd Infantry Division; at this time the 27th Battalion and brigade headquarters was deployed to Green Island, the 8th was on Emirau and the 7th was on Stirling Island and at Munda. However, in April 1945 the brigade was committed to the fighting on Bougainville Island, where they took over responsibility for the central and northern sectors, engaging the Japanese in direct combat for the first time, carrying out patrolling operations and launching a number of small attacks. During one of these attacks, north of Ratsua, one of the 8th Battalion's members, Private Frank Partridge, performed the deeds that led to him being awarded the Victoria Cross.

Following the end of hostilities, the brigade remained on Bougainville guarding Japanese prisoners as the demobilisation process began. Finally, in 1946 all its subordinate units were disbanded. In November 1945, command of the brigade transferred to Brigadier Noel Simpson. By January 1946, the brigade headquarters was located around Torokina, before moving to Fauro Island the following month. In early April, the brigade returned to Australia aboard HMAS Kanimbla, arriving in Sydney, where its constituent units returned to their states of origin, while the brigade's cadre personnel returned to Watsonia for disbandment. The brigade headquarters' final entry in its war diary was made in early May 1946.

== Bibliography ==
- Australian Military Forces (1912). The Military Forces List of the Commonwealth of Australia, 1 January 1912. Melbourne, Victoria: Government Printer. OCLC 221429471.
- Grey, Jeffrey (2008). A Military History of Australia (3rd ed.). Melbourne: Cambridge University Press. ISBN 978-0-521-69791-0.
- Kuring, Ian (2004). Redcoats to Cams: A History of Australian Infantry 1788–2001. Loftus, New South Wales: Australian Military Historical Publications. ISBN 1-876439-99-8.
- Palazzo, Albert (2001). The Australian Army: A History of its Organisation 1901–2001. Melbourne, Victoria: Oxford University Press. ISBN 0195515072.
- McKenzie-Smith, Graham (2018). The Unit Guide: The Australian Army 1939–1945, Volume 2. Warriewood, New South Wales: Big Sky Publishing. ISBN 978-1-925675-146.
- Morgan, Joseph (2013). "A Burning Legacy: The Broken 8th Division". Sabretache. LIV (3, September). Military Historical Society of Australia: 4–14. ISSN 0048-8933.
