= 2/40th Battalion =

WW2 Australian Army unit

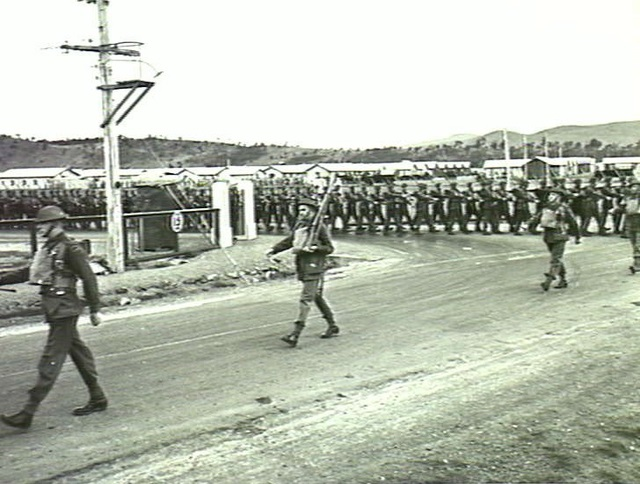
- Troops from the 2/40th march through Brighton, 1940
- Active: 1940–1942
- Country: Australia
- Branch: Australian Army
- Type: Light infantry
- Role: Close-quarters combat Forward observer Guerrilla warfare Jungle warfare Raiding; Reconnaissance
- Size: ~900 men
- Part of: Sparrow Force, 23rd Brigade, 8th Division
- Colours: White over red
- Engagements: Second World War: Battle of Timor

Commanders
- Notable commanders: William Leggatt

Insignia
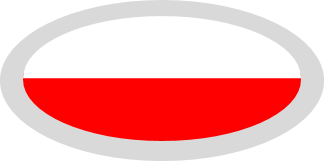
- Unit colour patch

The 2/40th Battalion was an infantry battalion of the Australian Army. Formed in mid-1940 from personnel recruited from Tasmania, the battalion was assigned to the 23rd Brigade, which formed part of the 8th Division. After completing basic training, the 2/40th was sent to Darwin to form part of the defensive garrison there as tensions with the Japanese grew throughout 1941. Following Japan's entry into the war, the battalion was deployed to Timor as part of Sparrow Force and in early 1942 they took part in the fighting on the island against the Japanese. Outnumbered and lacking supplies, the majority of the 2/40th's personnel were captured and spent the rest of the war as prisoners of war, although some were able to wage a guerrilla campaign across the island before being withdrawn by the end of year.

== History ==
=== Formation and garrison duty in Australia ===
Raised for service during the Second World War as part of the all-volunteer Second Australian Imperial Force (2nd AIF), the 2/40th Battalion (Note: The numerical designation of 2nd AIF units was prefixed by "2/", which was used to set them apart from Militia units with corresponding numerical designations.) formed part of the 23rd Brigade attached to the 8th Division; the majority of its personnel were drawn from the state of Tasmania. (Note: Of the battalion's 919 personnel, 80 per cent were born in Tasmania, while 86 per cent were enlisted from that state.) The colours chosen for the battalion's unit colour patch (UCP) were the same as those of the 40th Battalion, a unit which had served during the First World War before being raised as a Militia formation in 1921. These colours were white over red, in an oval shape, although a border of gray was added to the border of the UCP to distinguish the battalion from its Militia counterpart; the oval shape designated the battalion as being part of the 8th Division.

With an authorised strength of around 900 personnel, like other Australian infantry battalions of the time, the battalion was formed around a nucleus of four rifle companies – designated 'A' through to 'D' – each consisting of three platoons. The battalion's first commanding officer was a Tasmanian, Lieutenant Colonel Geoffrey Youl, a Militia officer who had previously commanded the 12th/50th Battalion and who, according to author Garth Pratten, was appointed largely as a result of political pressure from the Tasmania government. In July 1940, the 2/40th began training at Brighton, Tasmania, before moving to Bonegilla, Victoria, to join the rest of the 23rd Brigade in January 1941. While the 8th Division's other two brigades—the 22nd and 27th—would both subsequently be sent to Malaya, the 23rd was held back in Australia as the government decided to use it to defend the islands to Australia's north—Timor, Ambon and Rabaul—in the event of Japan's entry into the war; as part of this plan, the 2/40th was allocated to the defence of Timor.

In late March, the 2/40th moved north to the Katherine region, in the Northern Territory, with the last elements of the battalion arriving on 25 April 1941. There they undertook further training as the battalion received further drafts of men, before moving to Darwin over the course of a month between June and July. In Darwin they undertook defensive duties as part of the town's military garrison, with companies detached to defend various locations around Noonamah and Adelaide River.

=== Fighting in Timor and fate ===
Throughout October 1941 plans were put in place for the battalion's deployment to Timor, with a reconnaissance party being dispatched to the island between 6–12 October. Upon return, the battalion's commanding officer, Youl, was replaced by Lieutenant Colonel William Leggatt in "controversial circumstances" on 5 November 1941. The following month, shortly after the Japanese entered the war in the Pacific, the 2/40th Battalion embarked upon the transports Zealandia and Westralia on 8 December, and were deployed to Timor. Arriving there on 12 December 1941, they formed part of Sparrow Force which was tasked with defending the island against invasion by the Japanese.

After Japanese air strikes began in January 1942, the invasion came the following month on 20 February 1942, with Japanese soldiers carrying out airborne and amphibious landings around the island. Outnumbered and with limited supplies, after the initial contact the battalion destroyed the airfield and moved inland, reducing a number of Japanese positions as they went, including an attack upon Usua ridge where the Japanese 228th Infantry Regiment suffered at least 123 casualties on 22 February. By the morning of 23 February the situation was desperate and the battalion all but surrounded around Champlong. Lacking air cover and faced with an ultimatum to capitulate or be subjected to an intense aerial bombardment that would likely have wiped out the battalion, Leggatt was forced to surrender his command and as a result most of the 2/40th was captured. Some managed to escape, however, while others who had been detached elsewhere evaded capture and took part in the guerrilla campaign that followed before being evacuated back to Australia in December 1942. These personnel were dispersed to other units, with some being transferred eventually to the 2/12th Battalion, and the 2/40th Battalion was never reformed.

The men who were taken as prisoners spent the rest of the war in captivity in camps throughout Southeast Asia including Java, Burma, Thailand, Japan, Singapore and Sumatra and did not return to Australia until September 1945. The battalion had 271 men killed in action or died while prisoners of war, while a further 79 were wounded. For their involvement in the fighting on Timor members of the battalion received the following decorations: one Distinguished Service Order, one Military Medal and seven Mentions in Despatches.

== Battle honours ==
The battalion was awarded two battle honours for its service: "South-West Pacific 1942" and "Koepang". Koepang is unique to the 2/40th, with no other unit in the Australian Army holding this battle honour. In 1961–62, these honours were entrusted to the Royal Tasmania Regiment, and they are maintained by the 12th/40th Battalion, Royal Tasmania Regiment.

== Commanding officers ==
The following officers commanded the 2/40th during the war:

- Lieutenant Colonel Geoffrey Youl (1940–1941);
- Lieutenant Colonel William Leggatt (1941–1942).

== Gallery ==
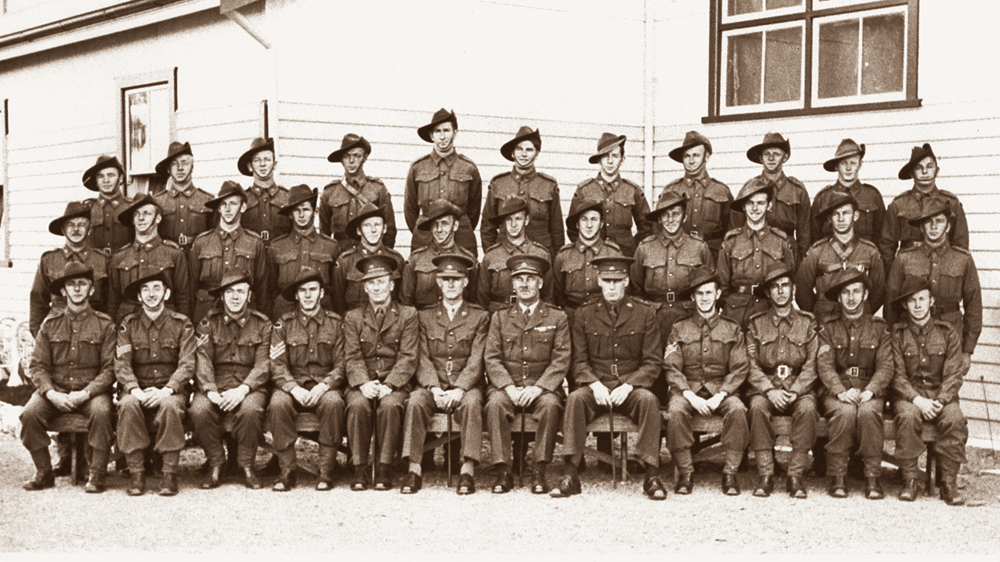
Officers of the 2/40th Infantry Battalion

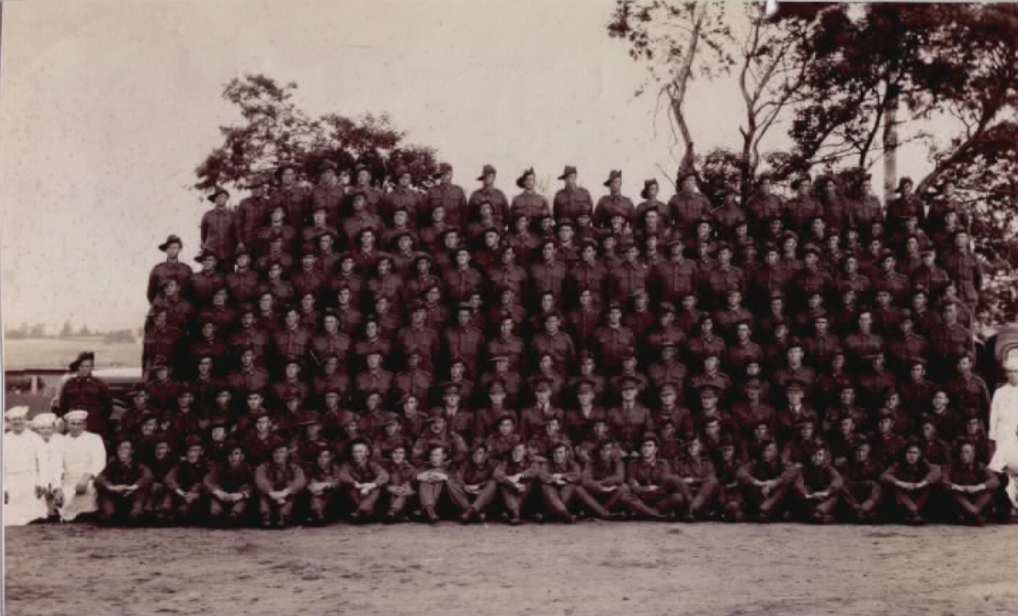
Headquarters Company

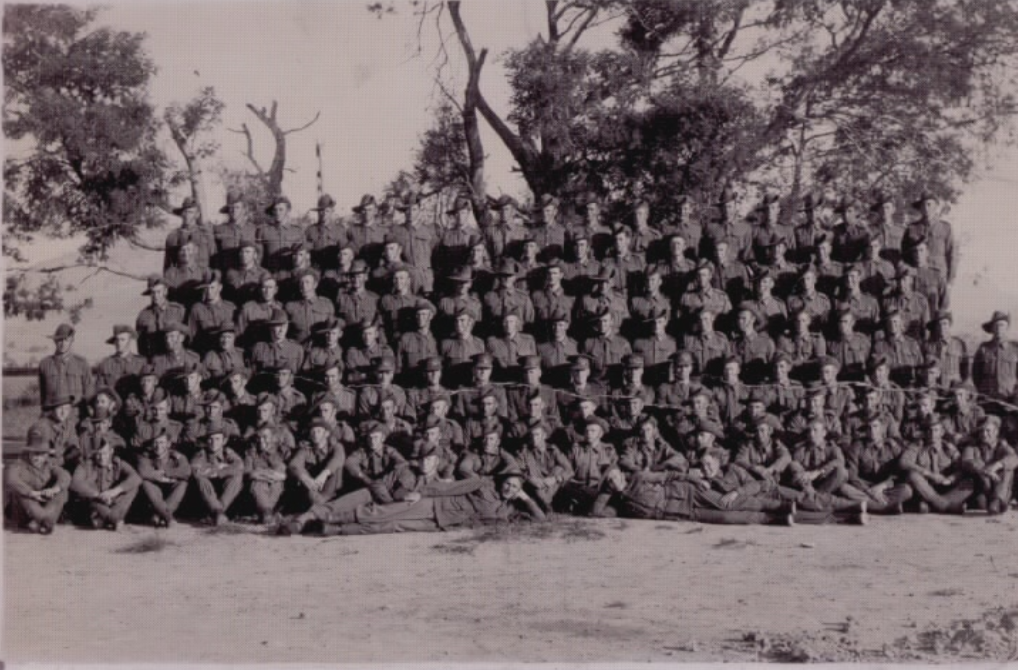
A Company

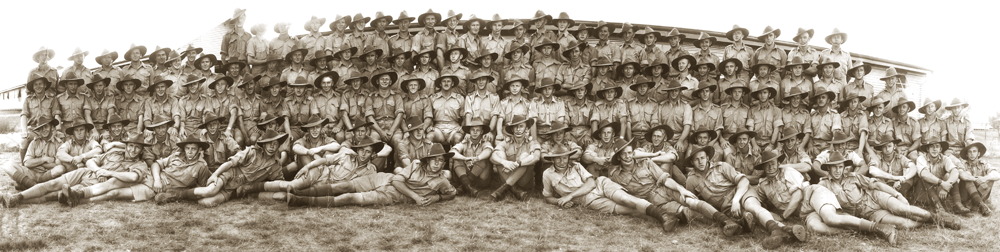
B Company

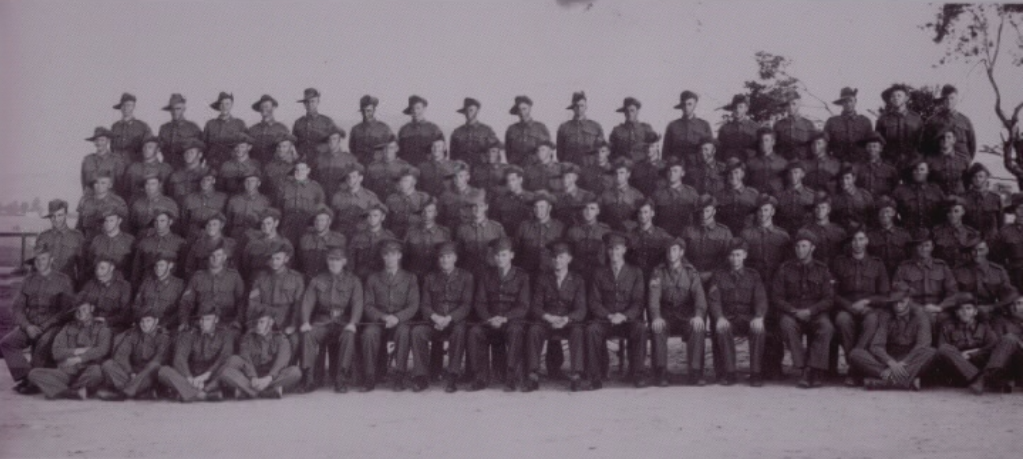
D Company

== Notes ==
Footnotes

Citations
