= 2/2nd Commando Squadron (Australia) =

Commando squadrons raised by the Australian Army

The 2/2nd Commando Squadron
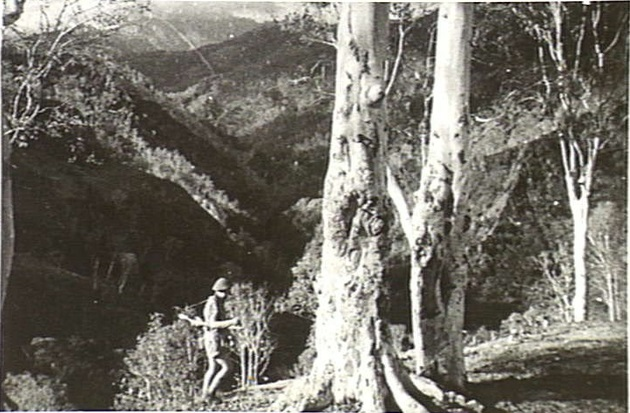
- An Australian commando in the mountains of Timor on 12 December 1942.
- Active: 1941–1946
- Country: Australia
- Branch: Australian Army
- Type: Commando
- Size: 17 officers, 256 other ranks
- Part of: Sparrow Force
- Double diamonds: Red
- Engagements: World War II: Battle of Timor; New Guinea campaign; New Britain campaign
- Decorations: Order of Timor-Leste

Commanders
- Notable commanders: Lieutenant Colonel Alexander Spence; Major Bernard Callinan; Major Geoffrey Laidlaw

Insignia
- Unit colour patch

The 2/2nd Commando Squadron was one of 12 independent companies or commando squadrons raised by the Australian Army for service during World War II. It was initially designated No. 2 Independent Commando Company, and served in Timor, New Guinea and New Britain during World War II, taking part in the Battle of Timor in June 1942 as part of Sparrow Force. Following the capture of the island, the company was withdrawn in December 1942 and returned to Australia, later taking part in operations in New Guinea in 1943–1944 and then on New Britain in 1945.

== History ==
=== Formation ===
Initially formed as " No 2 Independent Company", the unit was raised in 1941. With an authorised strength of 17 officers, 256 other ranks, it undertook training at No7 Infantry Training Centre Camp at Darby River,Wilsons Promontory, Victoria. After training the company was transported north to Katherine, Northern Territory, where they were stationed until Japan entered the war following the attacks on Pearl Harbor and Malaya.

=== Timor campaign ===
Amid fears of a Japanese advance towards mainland Australia, No.2 Independent Company was sent to Timor, as part of Sparrow Force, along with the 2/40th Battalion and a small force of artillery. Upon arriving at Dili on 17 December 1941, most of the 2nd Independent Company moved to protect Dili airfield in East Timor, whilst other elements took up positions in the nearby mountains. The Japanese invaded Timor on 20 February 1942, attacking both east and west Timor at the same time, quickly overwhelming the small force of Australian and Dutch defenders. Hopelessly outnumbered No.2 Independent Company was unable to hold the airfield and was forced to retreat into the mountains, from where they would wage a guerrilla campaign against the Japanese for over a year.

After the fall of the island, it was believed that No. 2 Independent Company had been captured along with the 2/40th Battalion, and for almost three months the unit was officially listed as missing by the Australian Army. On 19/20 April 1942, however, members of the unit were able to make contact with Darwin, using a wireless transmitter nicknamed Winnie the War Winner. "Winnie", reputedly named after Winston Churchill, was cobbled together by Signaller Max (Joe) Loveless, a Tasmanian member of the unit who had a background as an amateur radio station operator. The set was built on the back of a four-gallon kerosene tin, using parts from several failed radio sets. Some parts were obtained via night raids into occupied enemy territory. After this, the Royal Australian Navy was able to bring in supplies for the company on the south coast of East Timor in late May, allowing the guerrilla campaign to continue. During August, the Japanese launched a major offensive against the guerrillas and carried out a series of reprisals against the civilian population of East Timor in order to reduce their support for the Australians.

This campaign was ultimately unsuccessful, although the local Timorese paid a high price for the assistance they provided the Australians: it is estimated that between 40,000 and 60,000 Timorese perished during the Japanese occupation. In September, in an effort to maintain the pressure on the Japanese, the 2nd Independent Company was reinforced with the landing of No.4 Australian Independent Company. By late-November 1942, however, it was clear that the Australians could not sustain their campaign due to extreme ill-health amongst all the men, and the ever-increasing number of Japanese reinforcements as well as reduced food supplies. Furthermore, the Japanese used increasing numbers of Dutch Timorese to wreak havoc among the Portuguese Timorese, who then found it impossible to keep helping the Australians. As a result, both the 2/2 and 2/4 were withdrawn from Timor between mid-December 1942 and January 1943, along with Portuguese civilians, some Dutch troops and Timorese who would later serve with Z Special Unit.

=== New Guinea and New Britain campaigns ===
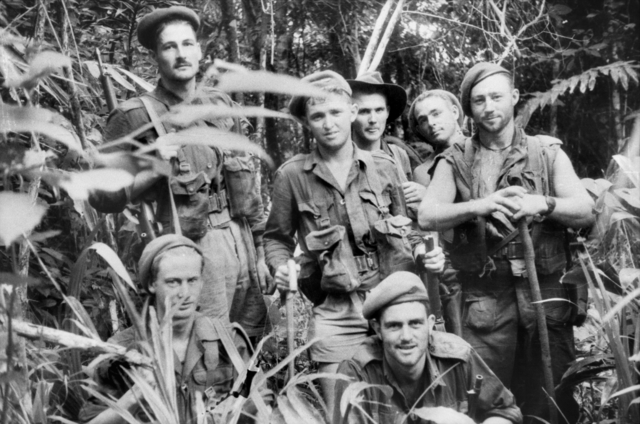
Seven members of the 2/2nd Independent Company in New Guinea during July 1943

Upon return to Australia, the company, now renamed the "2/2nd Independent Company", reformed at the training centre at the Jungle Warfare School at Canungra, Queensland, where it was reinforced and re-equipped. The 2/2nd was relocated to the Atherton Tableland Camp, Atherton Tableland, where it briefly became part of the 2/6th Cavalry (Commando) Regiment, although this was short lived as it became an independent unit once again not long afterwards. As a part of this re-organisation, the company would eventually be renamed the "2/2nd Commando Squadron".

In June 1943, the 2/2nd sailed from Townsville to Port Moresby and was subsequently flown to Bena Bena, in the Bismarck Ranges in New Guinea. Here, the 2/2nd supported the 2/7th Independent Company in patrolling the Ramu River area. In mid-July, the 2/2nd moved into position in Bena Bena and by the end of the month their patrols were skirmishing with the Japanese. They continued to conduct operations in New Guinea until October 1944 when, after being away from Australia for more than a year, the 2/2nd were withdrawn from the fighting for a period of leave in Australia. After three months leave, the 2/2nd Commando Squadron reformed at Strathpine, Queensland and began a period of training and re-organisation in preparation for their next campaign. In April 1945, the unit embarked for New Britain, where they landed at Jacquinot Bay on 17 April and subsequently moved to Wide Bay, in order to support the 13th Brigade, attached to the 5th Division that was based at Lamarien.

Following the end of hostilities in the Pacific in August 1945, the 2/2nd Commando Squadron was deemed to be surplus to the post-war requirements of the Australian Army and as such it was steadily reduced in strength as men were discharged or transferred to other units. The remainder returned to Australia and in early 1946 the 2/2nd Commando Squadron was disbanded. During its service during the war, the 2/2nd lost 22 men killed in action or died on active service. Members of the squadron received the following decorations: two Distinguished Service Orders, three Military Crosses, one Distinguished Conduct Medal, one Military Medal, 35 Mentions in Despatches and two foreign awards (Lieutenant Hector Henstridge was awarded a US Distinguished Service Cross).

== Legacy ==
After the war, some of the unit's members became advocates for the rights of the Timorese people, recognising the contribution that they had made to Australia's war effort. One member, John Patrick "Paddy" Kenneally, who died in March 2009 at the age of 93, said that the Australians would "...not have lasted a week had the Timorese not protected them". Kenneally visited East Timor four times after World War II; once in 1990 and a further three times after independence from Indonesia was achieved in 1999. In 2005, he appeared in TV advertisements promoting a fair deal for the people of East Timor in negotiations over Timor Sea gas and oil and was instrumental in securing a fair share of the gas field for the Timorese people. On 25 April 2008 Kenneally, two of his sons and one of his grandsons attended an Anzac Day service in East Timor, at a memorial overlooking Dili and built by veterans from the 2/2nd.

== Commanding officers ==
The following officers commanded the 2/2nd during the war:

- Major Alexander Spence, DSO
- Major Bernard Callinan, DSO, MC
- Major Geoffrey Gosford Laidlaw, DSO

== Decorations ==
On 26 November 2026, 2/2nd Commando Squadron was awarded the Order of Timor-Leste by the President of East Timor José Ramos-Horta.
