= SS Dainichi Maru (Mitsui Bussan, 1922) =

History
- Name: (Japan) SS Ibukisan Maru (1922-1935); (Empire of Japan) SS Dainichi Maru (1935–1944)
- Owner: Imperial Japanese Navy
- Builder: Mitsui Senpaku K. K.
- Yard number: 35
- Laid down: 14 August 1920
- Launched: 21 July 1921
- Completed: 15 May 1922
- In service: 15 May 1922
- Out of service: 8 October 1943
- Identification: Official Number: 28537
- Fate: Torpedoed and sunk, 8 October 1943

General characteristics
- Type: Iwatesan Maru-class auxiliary troopship
- Tonnage: 5,813 GRT
- Length: 117.3 m (384 ft 10 in)
- Beam: 15.5 m (50 ft 10 in)
- Depth: 11 m (36 ft 1 in)
- Installed power: A single triple expansion steam engine
- Propulsion: One screw propeller
- Speed: 10 knots (19 km/h; 12 mph)

SS Dainichi Maru was a Japanese troop- and Hell ship that was torpedoed by the United States Navy submarine USS Gurnard in the South China Sea west of Luzon, Philippines in the Luzon Strait at (18°48′N 119°21′E), while she was travelling in Convoy 772 from Takaoka, Japan, to Manila, Philippines.

== Construction ==
Dainichi Maru was laid down on 14 August 1920 at the Mitsui Senpaku K. K. shipyard in Tokyo, Japan. She was launched on 21 July 1921 and was completed on 15 May 1922. She was built for the Mitsui Line and was named Ibukisan Maru. She was renamed Dainichi Maru when she was bought by the Japanese company Itaya OSK Lines on 6 June 1935.

Dainichi Maru was 117.3 metres (384 ft 10 in) long, with a beam of 15.5 metres (50 ft 10 in) and a depth of 11 metres (36 ft 1 in). The ship was assessed at 5,813 GRT. She had a single triple expansion steam engine rated at 488 nominal horsepower and driving one screw. She had one funnel and two masts.

== World War II career ==
On 15 September 1941, the Imperial Japanese Army charted Dainichi Maru for use as a troopship.

Dainichi Maru participated as a troopship in Operation "M", the Japanese invasion of Lamon Bay, Philippines beginning on 17 December 1941 as the convoy departed Setouchi, Japan. The invasion force arrived at their destination on 24 December 1941 at 2 am, with the invasion proceeding without strong opposition.

During the early stages of the war, Dainichi Maru would go on to complete several voyages as a hell ship across southeast Asia, carrying many Allied prisoners of war (POWs).

== Sinking ==
On 8 October 1943, Dainichi Maru was part of Convoy 772, which consisted of five ships, including the cargo- and troopship Taian Maru and three other ships, escorted by a torpedo boat. At the time, Dainichi Maru was carrying 2,274 members of the 11th Independent Garrison Unit and 14th Army Workshop alongside their equipment.

The convoy was attacked in the South China Sea west of Luzon, Philippines in the Luzon Strait, while it was travelling from Takaoka, Japan, to Manila, Philippines, by the American submarine USS Gurnard at 1.39 am after the submarine had been stalking the convoy since midnight. The Gurnard went on to torpedo and sink both the Taian Maru and Dainichi Maru in the attack. 45 military personnel and 32 crew went down with Taian Maru as she sank, while on Dainichi Maru between 2,025 and 2,057 military personnel and 32 crew were killed.

== Wreck ==
The wreck of Dainichi Maru lies at (18°48′N 119°21′E). The condition of the wreck is currently unknown.
