= Men of Timor =

- Produced by: Ken G. Hall (uncredited)
- Narrated by: Peter Bathurst
- Cinematography: Damien Parer
- Production company: Cinesound Productions
- Release date: January 1943
- Running time: 9 minutes
- Country: Australia
- Language: English

Men of Timor is a 1943 short documentary propaganda film about the guerrilla warfare activities of Sparrow Force on Timor Island during World War II.

== Plot ==
The film opens with a map of the Timor Sea area, showing Timor Island, then Japanese occupied Dutch Timor and Portuguese Timor (East Timor), in relation to the coast of the Northern Territory in northern Australia. It briefly explains the circumstances of the Australian troops left behind, who did not surrender but carried on a guerrilla war against the Japanese.

After some very difficult forays behind enemy lines to capture equipment for radio, they manage to contact the Australian military in the city of Darwin across the Timor Sea. Wary of a possible Japanese trick, the military asked the Sparrow Force men what the first name of a wife of a particular sergeant was. When the correct answer, Joan, was returned, the Australian military starts to airlift supplies to the Allied guerrillas and their Timorese allies.

== Production ==
Damien Parer, British journalist Dixon-Brown and ABC war correspondent Bill Marien travelled to Timor in November 1942 to report on the conflict. The Australian soldiers delayed an attack until Parer's arrival so he could film it. Embarked from Darwin in HMAS Castlemaine, a corvette for Betano on 5 November 1942 and returned embarking at Belano in Timor for Darwin, Australia on 16 November 1942.

== Reception ==
The Sydney Morning Herald called the movie "memorable":

It epitomises the almost unbelievable adventure, as well as the daring, initiative, and courage, of some of the men fighting in this war... Character and fighting spirit, resourcefulness and grim determination, often lurking behind a grin, have been captured in some superbly photographed close-ups of these now famed Australian guerillas, These studies are the highlights of a documentary picture that will definitely help to immortalise a military venture linked with the destiny of Australia.

== See also ==
- List of Allied propaganda films of World War II
- Australian War Memorial
