= Attacks on Australia during World War II =

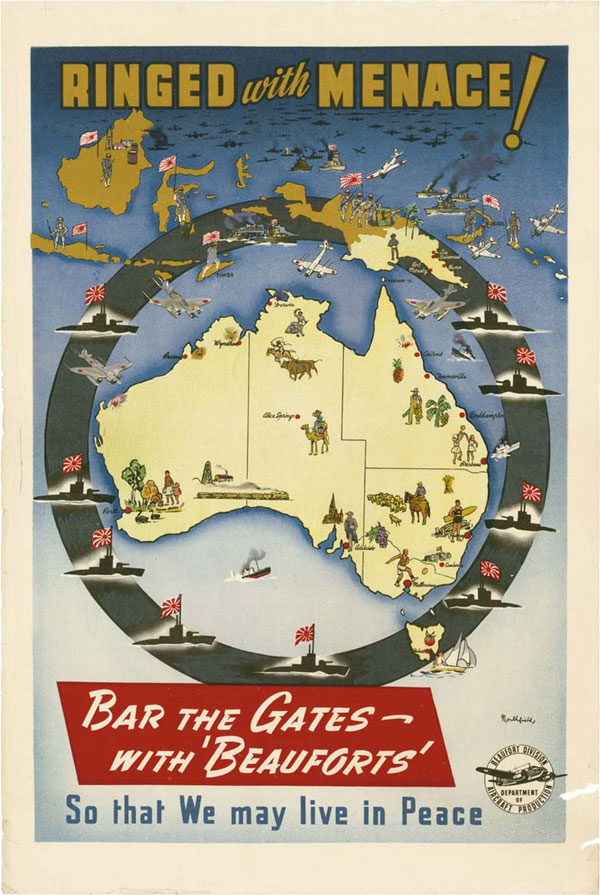
An Australian World War II propaganda poster produced in 1943 emphasising the threats posed by Japanese forces

Attacks on continental Australia during World War II were relatively rare due to Australia's geographic position. However, Axis surface raiders and submarines periodically attacked shipping in the Australian coastal waters from late 1940 to early 1945. Japanese aircraft bombed towns and airfields in Northern Australia on 97 occasions during 1942 and 1943.. Beginning in January 1942 through to the end of the war, Japan attempted its invasions of the Territory of New Guinea and the Territory of Papua, both of which were under Australian rule at the time.

== Naval attacks ==
Japanese submarines operated in Australian waters from January 1942 until July 1944. Major submarine offensives were carried out against shipping off the Australian east coast from May to July 1942 and January to July 1943.

From the evening of 31 May to the morning of 1 June 1942, Sydney harbor came under direct attack from Japanese midget submarines. HMAS Kuttabul, a converted ferry being used as a troop sleeper, was hit and sunk. 21 sailors were killed: 19 Australians and two members of the United Kingdom's Royal Navy.

In the early hours of 14 May 1943, the Japanese submarine I-177 torpedoed and sank the Australian hospital ship AHS Centaur off Point Lookout, Queensland. After being hit by a single torpedo, Centaur sank in less than three minutes with the loss of 268 lives. This is the single greatest loss of life resulting from a submarine attack in Australian waters. While hospital ships such as Centaur were legally protected against attack under the terms of the Geneva Conventions, it is unclear whether Commander Hajime Nakagawa of I-177 was aware that Centaur was a hospital ship. While the ship was clearly marked with a red cross and was fully illuminated, the light conditions at the time may have resulted in Nakagawa not being aware of Centaur's status, making its sinking a tragic accident. Nakagawa's poor record as a submarine captain and later conviction of machine gunning the survivors of a British merchant ship in the Indian Ocean has led to speculation by some that the sinking of Centaur was due to Nakagawa's incompetence or indifference to the laws of warfare. The attack on Centaur sparked widespread public outrage in Australia.

The only Japanese force to land in Australia during World War II was a reconnaissance party that landed in the Kimberley region of Western Australia on 19 January 1944 to investigate reports that the Allies were building large bases in the region. The party consisted of four Japanese officers on board a small fishing boat. It investigated the York Sound region for a day and a night before returning to Kupang in Timor on 20 January. Upon returning to Japan in February, the junior officer who commanded the party suggested using 200 Japanese prison inmates to launch a guerrilla campaign in Australia. Nothing came of this and the officer was posted to other duties.

Six German surface raiders also operated in Australian waters at different times between 1940 and 1943. These ships sank a small number of merchant ships and the Australian light cruiser HMAS Sydney. The German submarine U-862 also carried out attacks in Australian waters in late 1944 and early 1945.

== Air attacks ==
Darwin experienced its first air raid on 19 February 1942 involving over 260 aircraft. Subsequent raids in April, June, July and November 1942, and in March 1943, were carried out with forces of 30 to 40 fighters and bombers. Most of the raids occurred during daylight, but there were some small-scale night attacks. In response measures were taken to protect the region, including increasing military presence and fortifying key locations.

The last air raid on Darwin occurred on 12 November 1943, and no more air attacks were made on northern Australia after that. In total, there were 97 air attacks on northern Australia, though air reconnaissance was carried out over the region by Axis Powers through much of 1944.

== Sources ==
- AWM, (1990). Bombing of Darwin. Australian War Memorial. https://www.awm.gov.au/collection/E84294
- Clayton, Mark (April 1986). "The north Australian air war, 1942–1944". Journal of the Australian War Memorial (8). Canberra: Australian War Memorial: 33–45. ISSN 0729-6274.
- Frei, Henry P. (1991). Japan's Southward Advance and Australia. From the Sixteenth Century to World War II. Melbourne: Melbourne University Press. ISBN 0-522-84392-1.
