= Australian casualties of World War II =

Over 27,000 Australians were killed and 23,000 wounded in action during World War II. In addition, hundreds more servicemen and women were killed and injured in accidents during the war.

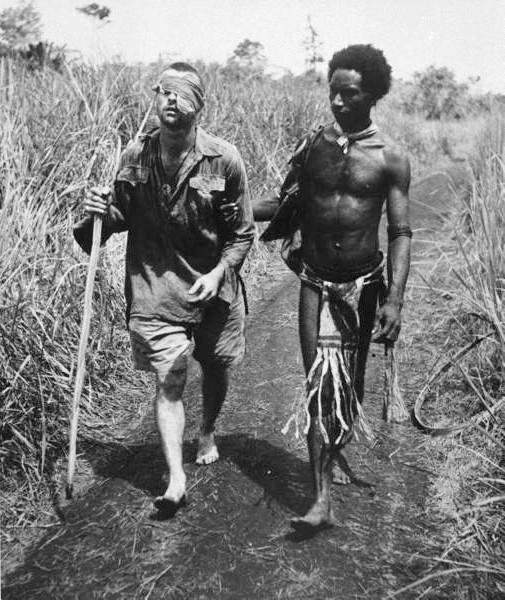
An Australian soldier, Private George "Dick" Whittington, is aided by Papuan orderly Raphael Oimbari, near Buna on 25 December 1942. Whittington died in February 1943 from the effects of bush typhus. (Picture by George Silk)

== Casualties by service ==
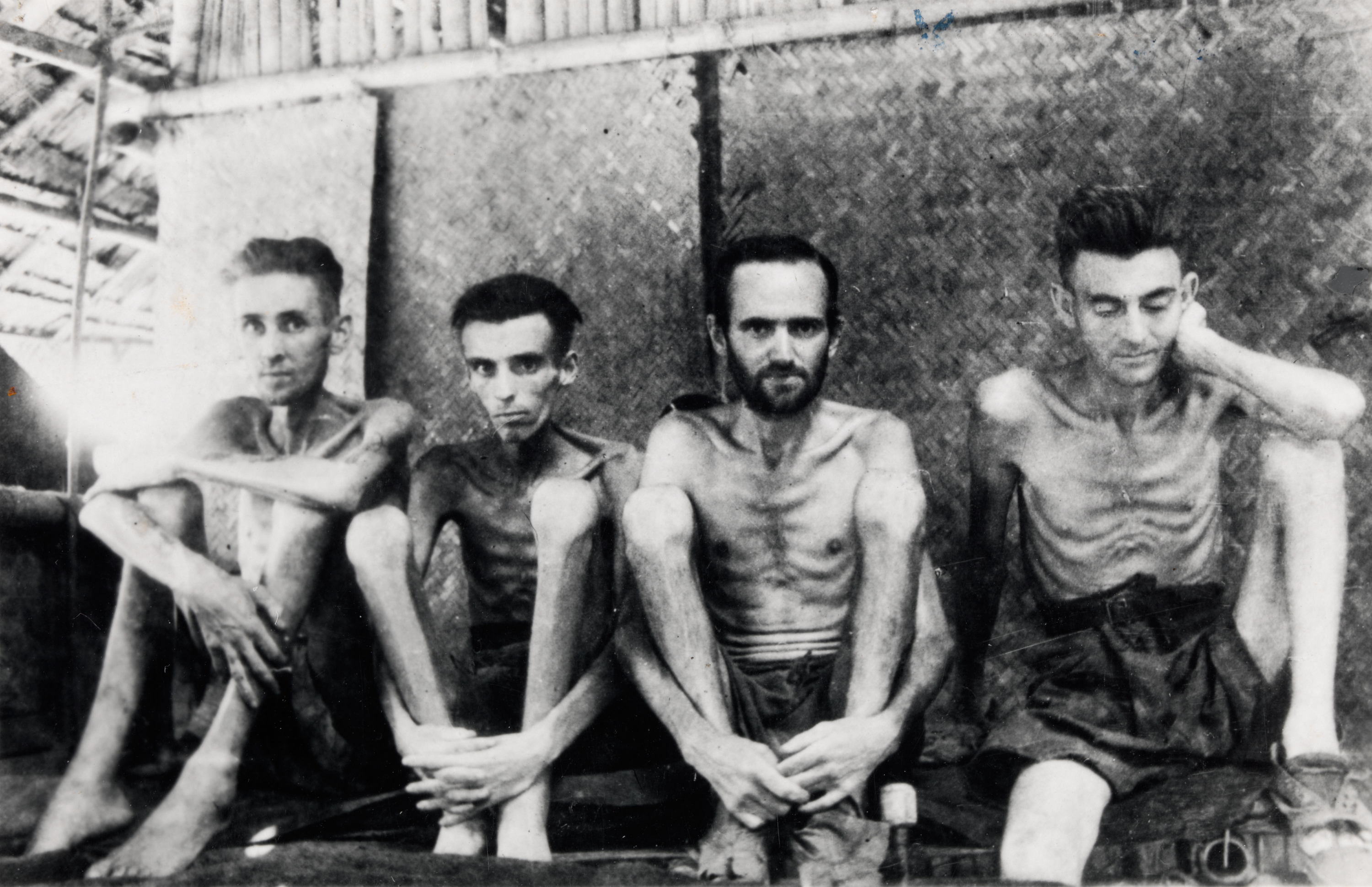
Australian and Dutch POWs at Tarsau, Thailand in 1943

The following table is taken from The Final Campaigns by Gavin Long. It excludes deaths and illnesses from natural causes, including disease.

	RAN	Army	RAAF	Total
War against Germany, Italy and Vichy France				
Killed in action	900	2610	5036	8546
Died of wounds	3	700	58	761
Died of wounds while POW		56	9	65
Died of sickness or injury while POW		95		95
Presumed died while POW		91	14	105
Total killed	903	3552	5117	9572
POW escaped, recovered or repatriated	25	6874	1020	7919
Wounded and injured in action (cases)	26	8925	529	9480
War against Japan				
Killed in action	840	6294	1140	8274
Died of wounds	41	1090	65	1196
Died of wounds while POW		50		50
Died of sickness or injury while POW		5336		5336
Presumed died while POW	116	2391	138	2645
Total killed	997	15161	1343	17501
POW escaped, recovered or repatriated	238	13872	235	14345
Wounded and injured in action (cases)	553	13191	253	13997
All theatres of war				
Killed in action	1740	8904	6176	16820
Died of wounds	44	1790	123	1957
Died of wounds while POW	0	106	9	115
Died of sickness or injury while POW	0	5431	0	5431
Presumed died while POW	116	2482	152	2750
Total killed	1900	18713	6460	27073
POW escaped, recovered or repatriated	263	20746	1255	22264
Wounded and injured in action (cases)	579	22116	782	23477

=== Non-battle casualties ===
The Australian Army suffered 1,165 killed and died of injuries in operational areas and a further 33,396 soldiers were wounded or injured. Casualties in non-operational areas were also significant, with 2,051 soldiers being killed or dying of injuries and 121,800 being wounded or injured. These figures also exclude deaths and illnesses from natural causes. The RAN suffered 177 non-battle casualties and the RAAF 6,271.
