= 2/14th Field Regiment (Australia) =

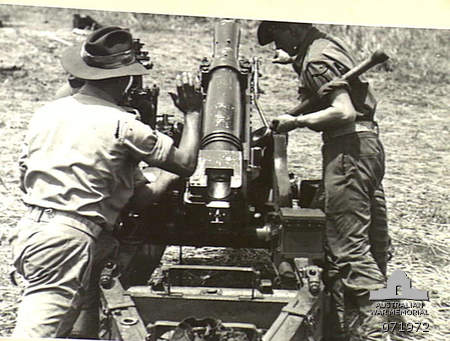
- Gunners from the 2/14th Field Regiment firing a Short 25-pounder, New Guinea, 1944
- Active: 1940–46
- Country: Australia
- Branch: Army
- Type: Artillery
- Size: ~ 600 personnel all ranks
- Part of: 8th Division; 9th Division; 5th Division
- Engagements: World War II: Huon Peninsula campaign; New Britain campaign
- Battle honours: Ubique

Insignia
- Unit colour patch

The 2/14th Field Regiment was an Australian Army artillery unit that served during the Second World War. Raised in late 1940 as part of the 8th Division, the regiment remained in Australia as a garrison force in Darwin when the division's infantry brigades were sent to various places around Southeast Asia to meet the threat posed by Japan. As a result, it did not deploy overseas until late 1943. In New Guinea, the regiment supported the 5th Division's operations on the Huon Peninsula throughout 1944 before deploying with them to New Britain in early 1945. From then, until the end of the war, the regiment engaged in operations against the large Japanese garrison on the island. At the end of the war, the 2/14th briefly undertook garrison duties on Rabaul as part of the 11th Division before returning to Australia and disbanding in January 1946.

== History ==
The regiment was formed on 17 October 1940 from volunteers for overseas service as part of the Second Australian Imperial Force. Assigned to the 8th Division as its second artillery regiment, the 2/14th's first commanding officer was Lieutenant Colonel Harry Sewell, a regular Army officer who had previously commanded the School of Artillery and 'A' Field Battery, Royal Australian Artillery. Regimental headquarters was established at Puckapunyal, Victoria, as was one of its two batteries: the 27th Battery, which was raised from personnel drawn from the state of Victoria. The second battery, the 28th Battery, was formed at Woodside Camp, outside of Adelaide, from South Australians. The majority of the officers and non commissioned officers were drawn from the ranks of the Militia, specifically personnel who had previously served in the 2/2nd Medium Training Regiment and the 13th Field Brigade.

Initial individual and collective training of the batteries was undertaken throughout the remainder of the year before the regiment concentrated at Puckapunyal early in 1941, by which time it consisted of 38 officers and 621 other ranks. The arrival of the South Australian battery enabled collective training on a regimental level as well as technical and specialist training on the Ordnance QF 18-pounder and 4.5-inch howitzer artillery pieces, and the assorted vehicles that the regiment was allocated. In June 1941, Lieutenant Colonel William Christie took over command of the regiment and the following month it was moved to Darwin, Northern Territory, moving via rail through Adelaide to Alice Springs and then to Winnellie Camp.

At Winnellie, the regiment joined the 23rd Infantry Brigade, which was the only part of the 8th Division that remained in Australia at that time; the other two brigades had already been deployed to Malaya where they were undertaking garrison duties. As such, it was believed that the regiment would soon be deployed and the arrival in Darwin was initially treated as a period of acclimatisation. Later, as war with Japan became likely, the brigade's three infantry battalions were deployed to the islands to Australia's north: the 2/21st to Ambon, the 2/22nd was sent to Rabaul and the 2/40th to Timor. The 2/14th, however, remained behind and stayed in the Darwin area for the next year-and-a-half undertaking training and garrison duties. As a result, after the Japanese overwhelmed these garrisons, the regiment became the only unit of the 8th Division that was not destroyed. Acknowledging this, the regiment adopted a modified, albeit temporary, unit colour patch consisting of a perpendicular bar that ran down the centre of the patch representing the "Broken Eighth Division"; when the captured men of the 8th were finally released from captivity, the plan was to remove the bar.

In March 1942, the Lieutenant Colonel Ronald Hone took over command of the regiment, which was also expanded to three batteries with the raising of the 64th Battery. In January 1943, the regiment moved to Loftus, New South Wales, handing over its garrison duties to the 2/11th Field Regiment. Following the 2/14th's arrival in Loftus in February, a period of leave followed, after which the regiment was re-equipped with the Ordnance QF 25-pounder gun and later throughout the year the regiment undertook familiarisation training, building towards two regimental exercises in June and July around Illawarra, New South Wales. Later, in September the regiment was re-organised in sympathy with the newly formulated Australian Army jungle establishment, which resulted in it being issued 81 jeeps and 63 four-wheel drive vehicles. The following month, the regiment moved north to Kalinga, Queensland, to prepare for embarkation overseas.

In December an advanced party from the regimental headquarters and the 64th Battery moved to Lae and after preparing a regimental area, moved on eight LCMs to Finschhafen where it joined the 9th Division. In January 1944, the 27th and 28th Batteries embarked upon the USS Stephen Girard at Townsville and joined the 64th in New Guinea. After establishing itself at Kelanoa, the regiment took over from the 2/12th Field Regiment, from which it acquired a number of Ordnance QF 25-pounder Short artillery pieces. As the fighting in the Huon Peninsula tailed off, the 9th Division handed over to the Militia 5th Division, which was tasked with completing the task of clearing the peninsula, and the regiment supported the 4th Infantry Brigade around Madang and then Alexishafen, where it remained until December 1944 when the 5th Division was dispatched to secure New Britain.

Conceptualised as a "mopping up" operation, the 5th Division's campaign was limited to containing the large Japanese force – up to 100,000 men – in the Gazelle Peninsula. Prior to departure, the 64th Battery replaced its Short 25-pounders with standard guns and by January 1945 it had landed at Jacquinot Bay. Over the course of the next eight months the regiment was heavily involved in supporting the 6th Infantry Brigade's operations around Waitavolo and Tol, and then the 13th Infantry Brigade's advance towards Moondei, as part of the effort to clear the area around Wide Bay and Open Bay. During the course of the campaign, a total of about 16,000 rounds were fired by the regiment's guns. Casualties amounted to two killed in action and five wounded.

Following the end of hostilities in August 1945, the regiment remained on New Britain until September when it was moved to Rabaul. While there it became part of the 11th Division, and undertook garrison duties guarding Japanese prisoners of war. Throughout November and December, the regiment's size fell as the demobilisation process saw members repatriated to Australia or transferred to other units for subsequent service. Finally, at the end of 1945, the regiment returned to Australia and on 17 January 1946 the regiment disbanded.

During the course of its involvement in the war, the regiment lost 20 men killed in action or died on active service and had another 10 wounded. The following decorations were awarded to 2/14th members: one Member of the Order of the British Empire, three Military Medals, one British Empire Medal and 31 Mentions in Despatches.

== Commanding officers ==
The following officers served as commanding officer of the 2/14th:

- Lieutenant Colonel H.B. Sewell (1940–41);
- Lieutenant Colonel W.J. Christie (1941–42); and
- Lieutenant Colonel R.B. Hone (1942–46).
