= Cecil Callaghan =

Australian general

Cecil Arthur Callaghan
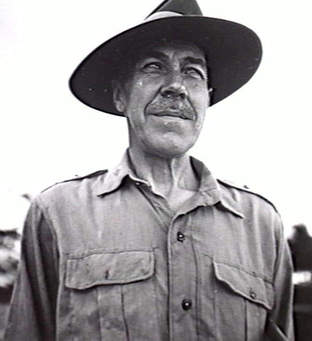
- Major General Cecil Callaghan in September 1945
- Born: 31 July 1890; Sydney, New South Wales
- Died: 1 January 1967 (aged 76); Gordon, New South Wales
- Military career
- Allegiance: Australia
- Branch: Australian Army
- Service years: 1910–1947
- Rank: Major General
- Nickname: "Boots"
- Service number: NX34723
- Commands: AIF in Malaya (1942); 8th Division (1942); 8th Divisional Artillery (1940–42); 8th Infantry Brigade (1934–38); 2nd Divisional Artillery (1926–34); 7th Field Artillery Brigade (1921–26); 3rd Field Artillery Brigade (1920–21); 4th Field Artillery Brigade (1918–19)
- Conflicts: First World War; Gallipoli campaign; Western Front; Battle of the Somme; Battle of Passchendaele; Hundred Days Offensive; Second World War; Malayan campaign; Fall of Singapore
- Awards: Companion of the Order of the Bath; Companion of the Order of St Michael and St George; Distinguished Service Order; Colonial Auxiliary Forces Officers' Decoration; Mentioned in Despatches (5); Legion of Honour (France)

Major General Cecil Arthur Callaghan, CB, CMG, DSO, VD (31 July 1890 – 1 January 1967) was an Australian Army officer who served during the First and the Second World Wars. He was the commander of the 8th Division when it surrendered to the Japanese Empire at the fall of Singapore in February 1942.

== Early life ==
Cecil Arthur Callaghan was born in Sydney, New South Wales, to a merchant and his wife on 31 July 1890. He worked in his father's footwear business after completing his education at Sydney Grammar School. He joined the Citizens Militia Force (CMF) in 1910 by enlisting in the Australian Field Artillery, and was commissioned the following year.

== Military career ==
=== First World War ===
After Britain's declaration of war against Germany in August 1914, Callaghan joined the Australian Imperial Force (AIF) and was shipped to the Middle East with the 2nd Battery of the 1st Field Artillery Brigade. He participated in the Gallipoli landings on 25 April 1915. He was awarded the Distinguished Service Order for his actions in July, with the medal's citation reading as follows:

For conspicuous gallantry and ability on 12th July, 1915, during an action on the Gallipoli peninsula. As Forward Observing Officer he advanced with the first line of infantry and established telephone communication with his battery from the captured hostile trenches. During the day he continued to advance under heavy fire, sending back accurate reports, valuable not only to the guns, but also to the Corps Staff.

He was evacuated in December 1915, with the rest of the Australian and New Zealand Army Corps, from Gallipoli to Egypt and transferred to the 5th Divisional Artillery. In March 1916, he was made commander of the 25th Howitzer Battery and promoted to major.

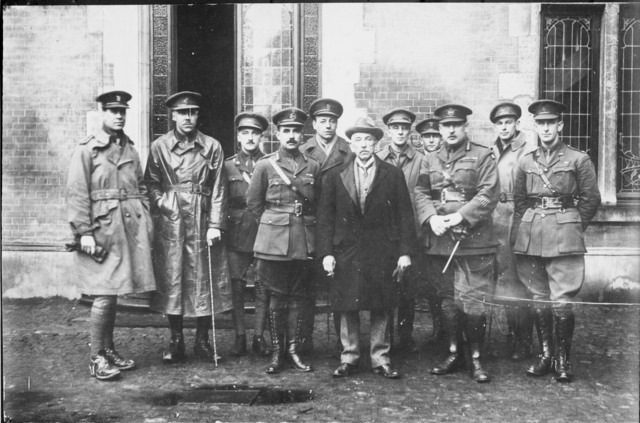
Lieutenant Colonel Callaghan, second from the left, with a group of fellow officers of 4th Brigade and the Prime Minister of Australia, Billy Hughes, in Belgium, 1919.

Posted to the Western Front, Callaghan commanded a battery in the 13th Field Artillery Brigade in the Somme and Ypres sectors during 1917. After being promoted to temporary lieutenant colonel and being placed in command of the 4th Field Artillery Brigade, he spent a month as a liaison officer to French troops in June 1918. He returned to his command in time to lead it during the Hundred Days Offensive, which ultimately led to the armistice with Germany and the end of the war,

Appointed a Companion of the Order of St Michael and St George, the last of his four Mentions in Despatches that were earned in the war was gazetted on 11 July 1919. He was also awarded the French Legion of Honour. Returning to Australia in July 1919, his service with the AIF was terminated on 22 January 1920.

=== Interwar period ===
Callaghan remained in the Citizens Militia Force (CMF) and in this capacity commanded various field artillery brigades from 1920 to 1926, as well as working in his family's footwear business (which would earn him the nickname "Boots"). In 1926, he was made temporary colonel and was made Commander, Royal Artillery (CRA) of the artillery of the 2nd Division (a CMF unit at the time) for several years under the then Brigadier General Gordon Bennett. His rank made permanent, he commanded the 8th Infantry Brigade, another CMF unit, from May 1934 to May 1938.

=== Second World War ===
Following the outbreak of the Second World War in September 1939, Callaghan was returned to active service in the Royal Australian Artillery, promoted to brigadier in November, and assigned as CRA of Eastern Command. When the 8th Division was formed in July 1940 as part of the Second Australian Imperial Force, he was made the division's CRA. When the divisional commander, Major General Vernon Sturdee, was appointed Chief of the General Staff (CGS) following the death of General Sir Brudenell White in August 1940, Callaghan once again came under the command of Bennett (now a major general), the new divisional commander.

==== Malayan campaign ====
Originally intended for the Middle East, one brigade (the 22nd) of the 8th Division embarked to Malaya in February 1941 to counter the growing threat from the Japanese Empire. Callaghan remained in Australia with the remainder of the division, eventually arriving in Singapore with the 27th Brigade in August. When the Japanese invaded Malaya on 8 December 1941, Callaghan was temporarily in command of the division while Bennett was in transit from a three-week visit to the Middle East, relinquishing command of the division to Bennett upon his return on 10 December. By early 1942, the Australians had retreated to Singapore Island, with Callaghan personally controlling the artillery supporting the defence of the northern side of the island. However, he was struck down with malaria on 5 February and had to be evacuated to hospital. He eventually returned to his headquarters on 12 February, although command of the divisional artillery remained with a subordinate.

The Allied position on Singapore was now untenable, and on 15 February the General Officer Commanding, Malaya Lieutenant General Arthur Percival decided to surrender. Bennett, rather than surrender with his command, opted to try and escape and handed command of the division to Callaghan. The division was surrendered to the Japanese the following day, Callaghan reporting personally to Japanese military authorities. Percival promoted him to temporary major general to ensure Callaghan had sufficient status with the Japanese as commander of all Australian forces in Singapore.

Callaghan was made a prisoner of war and was held in a former British Army barracks near Changi Prison, along with the other Allied soldiers that had surrendered to the Japanese in Singapore. He was later held in camps in Formosa, Japan and lastly in Manchuria, from which he was liberated by the Red Army in August 1945. As a result of malaria, dysentery and the generally harsh conditions experienced by most prisoners of the Japanese, he lost a considerable amount of weight. As a prisoner of war, he endeavoured to maintain morale and discipline amongst his fellow prisoners. He was rewarded for his efforts by being made a Companion of the Order of the Bath and was Mentioned in Despatches after the war. He also provided evidence in investigations of Bennett's escape from Singapore, of which he did not approve.

== Later life ==
Callaghan retired from the Australian Army on 10 April 1947, having been made a major general earlier that year (backdated to 1 September 1942). After his retirement, he became involved with the Returned Sailors', Soldiers' and Airmen's Imperial League of Australia. Ill for some time, he died on 1 January 1967, at the age of 76. The 8th Division Association honoured his death with a memorial service, and his remains were cremated.
