= 4th Pioneer Battalion =

4th Pioneer Battalion may refer to:

- 4th Pioneer Battalion (Australia): a unit of the Australian Army that served during the First World War
- 2/4th Pioneer Battalion (Australia): a unit of the Australian Army that served during the Second World War
- 4th Combat Engineer Battalion: a United States Marine Corps unit, which was originally designated as the 4th Pioneer Battalion
