= 4th Pioneer Battalion (Australia) =

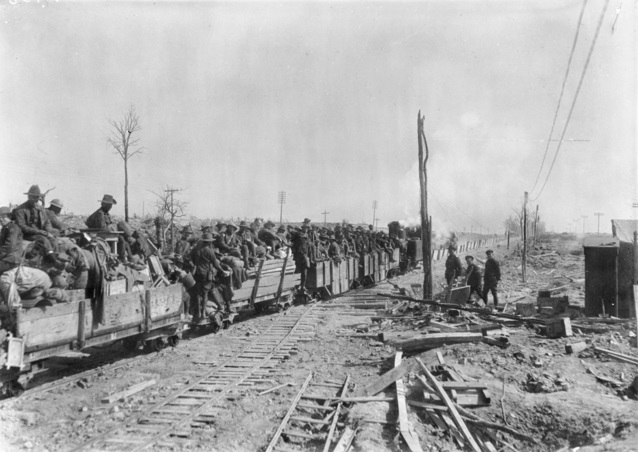
- Soldiers from the 4th Pioneers move between positions at the front via train, April 1917
- Active: 1916–1919
- Country: Australia
- Branch: Australian Army
- Role: Pioneer
- Size: Battalion
- Part of: 4th Division
- Colours: Purple and white
- Engagements: First World War: Western Front

Insignia
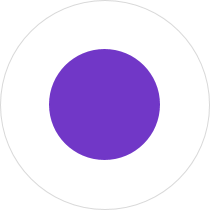
- Unit colour patch

The 4th Pioneer Battalion was an Australian infantry and light engineer unit raised for service during the First World War as part of the all volunteer Australian Imperial Force (AIF). Formed in Egypt in March 1916, the battalion subsequently served on the Western Front in France and Belgium, after being transferred to the European battlefields shortly after its establishment. Assigned to the 4th Division, the 4th Pioneer Battalion fought in most of the major battles that the AIF participated in between mid-1916 and the end of the war in November 1918. It was subsequently disbanded in early 1919.

== History ==
The 4th Pioneers were established on 16 March 1916, at Tel-el-Kebir in Egypt, and were subsequently assigned to the 4th Division. The battalion was formed in the aftermath of the failed Gallipoli campaign when the Australian Imperial Force (AIF) was expanded as part of plans to transfer it from the Middle East to Europe for service in the trenches along the Western Front. This expansion saw several new infantry divisions raised in Egypt and Australia, as well as specialist support units such as machine gun companies, engineer companies, artillery batteries and pioneer battalions, which were needed to meet the conditions prevalent on the Western Front.

Trained as infantrymen, they were also tasked with some engineer functions, with a large number of personnel possessing trade qualifications from civilian life. As such, they were designated as pioneer units. The pioneer concept had existed within the British Indian Army before the war, but had not initially been adopted in other British Empire forces. In early 1916, the Australian Army was reorganised ahead of its transfer to the Western Front in Europe. A total of five pioneer battalions were raised by the AIF at this time, with one being assigned to each of the five infantry divisions that the Australians deployed to the battlefield in France and Belgium. Tasked with digging trenches, labouring, constructing strong points and light railways, and undertaking battlefield clearance, the troops assigned to the pioneers required construction and engineering experience in addition to basic soldiering skills.

Consisting largely of volunteers drawn from Queensland, the battalion consisted of four companies, under a headquarters company. The battalion's first commanding officer was Lieutenant Colonel James Corlette. For a period in 1917, the 26-year-old Vernon Sturdee, who later rose to be Chief of the General Staff, served as commanding officer. The battalion subsequently served on the Western Front from mid-1916 until the end of the war. To identify the battalion's personnel, they were issued with a purple and white unit colour patch. The colours were in common with other Australian pioneer battalions, while the circle shape denoted that the unit was part of the 4th Division.

After arriving in Europe in mid-1916, the 4th Pioneers gained their first experience of trench warfare around Armentieres, which was considered a quiet sector where newly arrived troops could gain experience prior to being committed to more hectic parts of the front. Their stay within the nursery sector was short, as the 4th Division was sent to the Somme shortly afterwards to replace the 2nd Division around Pozieres, arriving in late July – early August. They subsequently took part in the defence of the heights during the final phase of the Battle of Pozieres. This would be their first major battle of the war and for the next two-and-half-years, the battalion took part – albeit in a support role only and never in their infantry role – in most of the major battles that involved Australian troops, such as: the Battle of Mouquet Farm, the Battle of Bullecourt, the Battle of Messines, the Third Battle of Ypres, the German spring offensive – with defensive actions around Hebuterne and Dernancourt – and the Hundred Days Offensive, which finally brought an end to the war in November 1918. The battalion's final actions were fought around Bellenglise, along the St Quentin Canal, in mid-September 1918 in support of the 4th Division's final assault on the Hindenburg Line. After the conclusion of hostilities, the battalion's personnel were slowly repatriated back to Australia for demobilisation and the battalion was disbanded in April 1919.

== Legacy ==
Within the AIF, according to historian William Westerman, the pioneer battalion concept was not "effectively employed by Australian commanders". In this regard, Westerman argues that the AIF pioneer battalions were rigidly utilized as either engineers or infantry, instead of "integrating those two functions". Additionally, while he argues that they were under utilised in their infantry roles, and that the amount of time that was spent training as infantry and the resources consumed was disproportionate for the amount of time they spent in the line undertaking infantry tasks. While some battalions, such as the 2nd Pioneers at Montrebrehain, undertook successful infantry actions, units such the 1st and 4th Pioneers never saw action directly in their infantry role. Additionally, the units' separation from the field engineers resulted in "administrative, organisational and command and control problems" which even limited their utility as engineering formations.

After the war, the concept of pioneer battalions was discontinued in the Australian Army. In the immediate aftermath of the war, as plans were drawn up for the shape of the post conflict Army, a proposal was put forth to raise six pioneer battalions in the peacetime Army, but a combination of global disarmament and financial hardship resulted in this plan being scrapped. As a result, pioneer battalions disappeared from the Australian Army order of battle until the Second World War, when four such battalions were raised as part of the Second Australian Imperial Force. According to Alexander Rodger, as a result of the decision not to re-raise pioneer battalions in the interwar years, no battle honours were subsequently awarded to the 4th Pioneer Battalion – or any other First World War pioneer battalion – as there was no equivalent unit to perpetuate the honours when they were promulgated by the Australian Army in 1927.
