= Gordon Bennett (general) =

Australian Army general

Henry Gordon Bennett
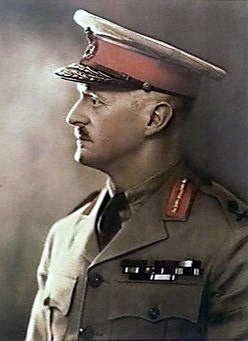
- Bennett in 1962
- Born: 15 April 1887; Balwyn, Melbourne
- Died: 1 August 1962 (aged 75); Dural, Sydney
- Spouse: Bess Buchanan (m. 1916–1962)
- Children: 1 daughter
- Military career
- Allegiance: Australia
- Branch: Australian Army
- Service years: 1908–1944
- Rank: Lieutenant General
- Commands: III Corps (1942–1944); 8th Division (1940–1942); 2nd Division (1926–1932); 9th Infantry Brigade (1921–1926); 3rd Infantry Brigade (1916–1918); 6th Battalion (1915–1916)
- Conflicts: World War I; Gallipoli campaign; Western Front; World War II; Malayan campaign; Fall of Singapore
- Awards: Companion of the Order of the Bath; Companion of the Order of St Michael and St George; Distinguished Service Order; Volunteer Decoration; Mentioned in Despatches (8); Knight Commander of the Order of Prince Danilo I (Montenegro)
- Other work: Orchardist; company director; board chairman

Lieutenant General Henry Gordon Bennett, CB, CMG, DSO, VD (15 April 1887 – 1 August 1962) was a senior Australian Army officer who served in both World War I and World War II. A citizen soldier by background, Bennett began his professional life in the insurance industry and joined the Army on a part-time basis. During World War I, he rose rapidly through the ranks, commanding at both battalion and brigade level. He became the youngest general in the Australian Army and was highly decorated for his leadership and gallantry on the Western Front. After the war, he returned to civilian life, continuing his military service in a part-time capacity and holding senior command appointments within the Citizen Military Forces.

Bennett is most widely remembered for his role in the Fall of Singapore in February 1942 during World War II. As commander of the 8th Australian Division, he was among the senior Allied officers present when the British-led garrison surrendered to the advancing Japanese forces. Instead of surrendering, Bennett escaped to Sumatra and later returned to Australia, claiming he had done so to avoid capture and report directly to Australian authorities. He believed that he could better serve the war effort from outside captivity. Bennett's actions were met with widespread public and military criticism, seen by many as a breach of duty and a failure of command. Although he was subsequently appointed to an important corps-level post in Australia, he was never again entrusted with leading troops in combat.

In 1945, both a Royal Commission and a military inquiry were convened to investigate the circumstances of his departure from Singapore. They concluded that he had not been justified in relinquishing his command. After retiring from the Army at the end of the war, Bennett turned to farming in the Hills District outside Sydney. He remained active in business circles and contributed regularly as a military commentator. The controversy surrounding his wartime decisions continued to shape his public image until his death in 1962 at the age of 75.

== Early life ==
Bennett (who was always known as Gordon) was born in Balwyn, Melbourne, on 15 April 1887, to George Bennett, a South African-born school teacher, and his Australian-born wife, Harriet. He was the sixth of nine children and attended Balwyn State School, where his father taught, and then Hawthorn College as a teenager having been given a three-year scholarship. While at Hawthorn, he did well at mathematics and in 1903, as a 16-year-old, after completing a competitive examination he was accepted into the AMP Society to train as an actuary. In May 1908, just after he turned 21, Bennett volunteered to serve in the Militia, Australia's reserve military force, joining the 5th Australian Infantry Regiment as a "recruit officer". After completing a six-month part-time course, he was appointed as a provisional second lieutenant, and posted to the regiment's 'B' Company, in Carlton, Victoria. He continued to work at AMP during this time, but devoted most of his spare time to his military duties and rose in rank quickly, reaching major in 1912, at the age of 25, when he became adjutant of his regiment.

At the outbreak of World War I in 1914, Bennett volunteered to serve with the Australian Imperial Force (AIF) and, after securing his release from AMP on full pay, was appointed second-in-command of the 6th Battalion, which was part of the 2nd (Victorian) Infantry Brigade, assigned to the 1st Division. After a short period of training, the 1st Division began to embark for Europe. Just prior to his departure overseas, Bennett became engaged to Bess Agnes Buchanan, whom he had met at a dance in Canterbury. As an engagement gift, Bess bought her betrothed a miniature photo of herself, set in a gold frame. Bennett carried the picture in his jacket pocket while serving overseas and it later saved his life on the Western Front, deflecting a German bullet.

== Gallipoli ==
While in transit, as a result of overcrowding in training camps in the United Kingdom, the 1st Division was diverted to Egypt with the intention that it would complete its training there before moving to the Western Front at a later date. The decision by the Allies to force a passage through the Dardanelles interrupted this process, as the 1st Division was allocated to take part in the Gallipoli Campaign. During the landing at Anzac Cove on 25 April 1915, Bennett fought on the southern flank of the Anzac beachhead. He led 300 men of his battalion to an advanced position on Pine Ridge, south of Lone Pine. While directing the defence of this position, Bennett was wounded in the shoulder and wrist and forced to retire to the beach for treatment. When the Turkish forces counter-attacked in the evening, the 6th Battalion force on Pine Ridge was isolated and killed to the last man, including Bennett's younger brother, Godfrey. Instead of accepting evacuation on a hospital ship, after having his wounds treated, Bennett returned to his battalion.

In early May, the 2nd Brigade was selected to move to Cape Helles to reinforce the British forces for the Second Battle of Krithia. After being transferred by boat, on 8 May, Bennett advanced with his battalion in impossible conditions. Bennett was the only officer of the 6th, and one of few in the 2nd Brigade, to survive the advance unscathed, although he was lucky do so; as he led the charge, a Turkish bullet hit the ammunition pouch he wore, exploding the ammunition in it. He was knocked off his feet, but otherwise unharmed. With a handful of men, he achieved the furthest advance of the attack. He became commander of the 6th Battalion the next day. The battalion was then returned to Anzac by a trawler, and shortly afterwards, Bennett's command of the battalion was confirmed and he was promoted to lieutenant colonel.

Throughout June and July, Bennett's battalion occupied the front line during a period of reduced tempo fighting as a stalemate developed. On 7 August, when the Allies launched their August Offensive to break the stalemate, the 6th Battalion was involved in one of the supporting attacks at the start of the Battle of Sari Bair. While the best known attack was made by the 3rd Light Horse Brigade at the Nek, the 6th was required to make a similar attack against a neighbouring Turkish position known as German Officers' Trench from which machine guns enfiladed the Australian positions as far north as the Nek. Two attempts to capture the trench failed. A third attempt was organised and Bennett resolved to lead it himself but the commander of the 1st Division, Major General Harold Walker, after consulting with the corps commander, Lieutenant General William Birdwood, agreed to abandon the attack. The 6th Battalion's losses totalled 80 killed and 66 wounded.

Following the attack on the German Officers' Trench, Bennett's battalion was withdrawn from the front line briefly, before relieving the 1st Brigade, which had successfully captured Lone Pine. The August Offensive failed and a further lull in the fighting occurred. The following month, as reinforcements in the shape of the 2nd Division arrived at Anzac, the original Australian units were relieved on a rotational basis, including the 6th Battalion, which was sent back to Lemnos. While there, Bennett was hospitalised with paratyphoid and during his stay in hospital, he received word that he had been appointed a Companion of the Order of St Michael and St George (CMG). When the 6th Battalion was returned to Gallipoli, Bennett sought to return with them, but was ordered to sail to England aboard the transport Aquitania for further treatment. As well as his CMG, Bennett was also mentioned in despatches twice for his service at Gallipoli.

== Western Front ==
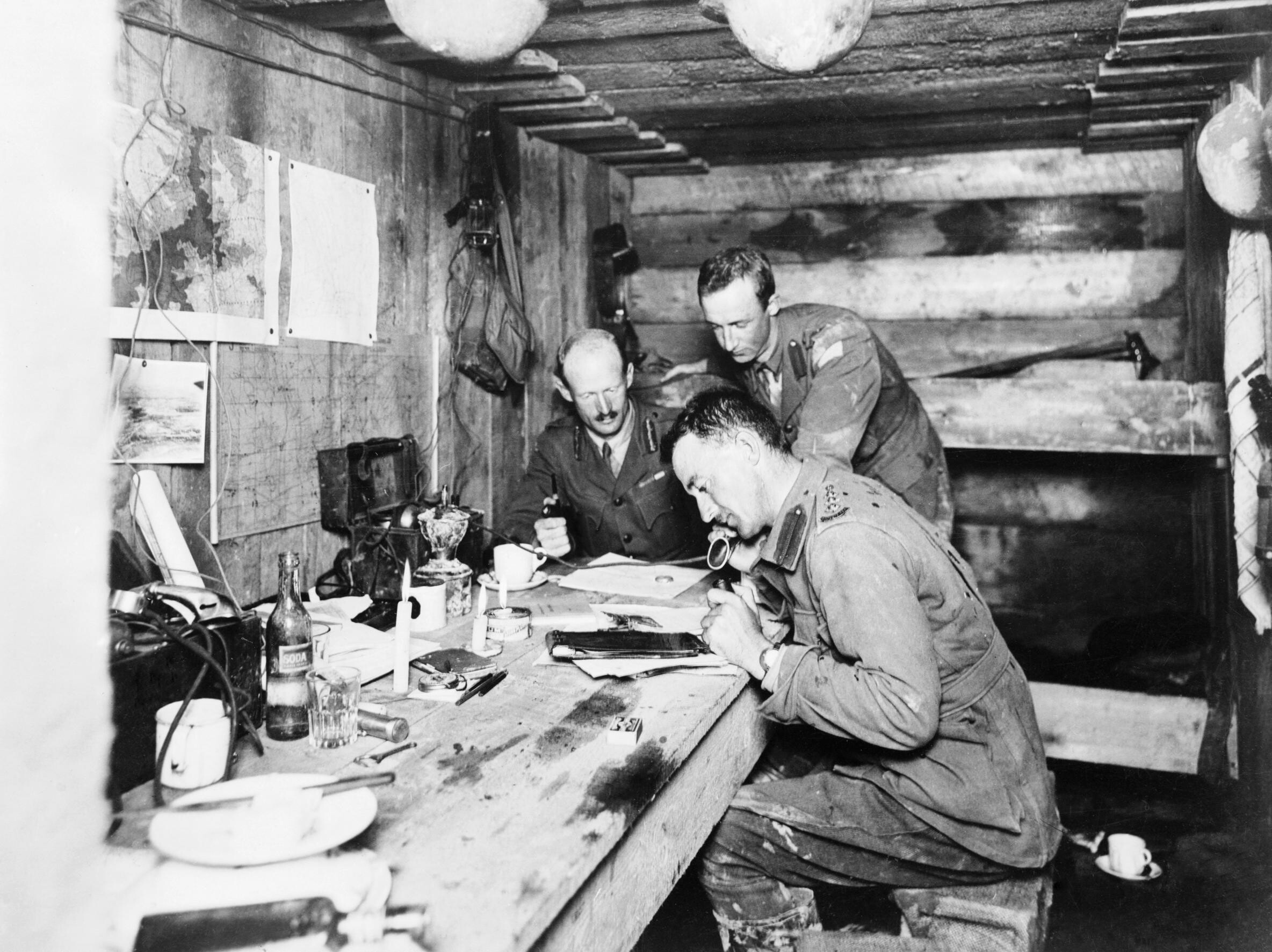
Bennett and his headquarters staff near the Menin Road, Belgium, 20 October 1917

Bennett spent Christmas in Southampton, before returning to Egypt early in January 1916. There, he rejoined his battalion, which was stationed around Gebel Habeita, defending the Suez Canal. He arrived just as the AIF began a period of reorganisation and expansion, which saw the experienced units of the 1st Division being split to provide cadres to the newly formed 5th Division; as a part of this, the 6th Battalion was split to help form the 58th Battalion in late February.

In March 1916, the 1st Division moved to France as part of the transfer of the AIF's infantry formations to the Western Front. Bennett subsequently led the 6th Battalion through the Battle of Pozières. After the 1st and 3rd Brigades had captured the town on 24 July 1916, the 6th and 8th Battalions of the 2nd Brigade moved in to occupy the ruins where they had to endure a prolonged artillery bombardment. Bennett's battalion headquarters was in a log hut. The hut received six direct hits from shells but survived due to the debris that had accumulated around it. Shortly after Bennett relocated his HQ the hut was finally demolished. On 26 July Bennett protested at the conditions his men had to endure, reporting: "My men are being unmercifully shelled. They cannot hold out if an attack is launched. The firing line and my headquarters are being plastered with heavy guns and the town is being swept by shrapnel. I myself am O.K. but the front line is being buried." In the capture of Pozières, Bennett's 6th Battalion suffered 190 casualties, the least by a considerable margin of the 12 battalions in the 1st Division.

After this, Bennett continued to serve as the commanding officer of the 6th Battalion, as well as acting as the 3rd Brigade commander. In mid-November, Bennett took a brief leave in London, where he was reunited with his fiancée, Bess, who had sailed from Melbourne with her father to meet him. On 16 November, they were married in Chelsea, and after a short honeymoon in Scotland, Bennett returned to the front. On 3 December 1916, he was given command of the 3rd Infantry Brigade and promoted to brigadier general, becoming at 29 the youngest general in the Australian Army. He commanded the brigade for the remainder of the war on the Western Front, leading the brigade through several notable actions, including at Bullecourt, Menin Road, and Passchendaele during 1917, and several actions against the Hindenburg Line in 1918. While Bennett was serving at the front, his wife remained in England; he returned to her briefly in November 1917 and again in July 1918. Just after the war ended, Bess returned to Australia with the couple's 10-month-old daughter, while Bennett remained in Europe until June 1919, briefly touring the Rhine and then viewing the London victory parade, where he escorted Lady Birdwood while her husband, Lord Birdwood, the former commander of the Australian Corps, marched.

For his service on the Western Front, Bennett received many awards. He received the Order of Danilo from Montenegro in 1917, was appointed a Companion of the Order of the Bath in 1918, received a Distinguished Service Order in 1919 and mentioned in despatches a further six times. His attitude towards regular officers and temperament, as well as his tendency to act without clearing his actions with superiors, though, resulted in criticism from senior officers.

== Between the wars ==
Upon his return to Australia, Bennett lived at Canterbury with his wife and daughter, while he sought to return to civilian life after his appointment to the AIF was terminated. He was offered his old position at AMP back, having been on full-time leave with pay while serving overseas, but was unhappy with this. He was eventually offered a position in the Commonwealth Bank in Sydney and he moved there with his family. Later, he purchased a textile factory and worked as a clothing manufacturer and public accountant before being appointed chairman of the New South Wales Repatriation Board in 1922, in which role he was able to help returned soldiers. In 1928, he was appointed as an administrator of the City of Sydney, along with two other commissioners. He was president of the Chamber of Manufactures of New South Wales between 1931 and 1933 and the Associated Chambers of Manufactures of Australia between 1933 and 1934, and was involved in several conservative political groups such as the All for Australia League and the Defence of Australia League.

Bennett remained active in the military, continuing to serve as part of the Militia, which was reorganised in 1921 following the conclusion of the demobilisation process. From then until 1926, he served as commander of the 9th Infantry Brigade, before being appointed to command the 2nd Division. In 1930, he was promoted to the rank of major general and over the ensuing years became increasingly parochial against the small permanent Staff Corps. He was transferred to the unattached list in 1932. In 1937, amidst increasing tensions in Europe, he came into conflict with the Military Board after he wrote a number of newspaper articles expressing his concerns about complacent defence policy and the efficiency of regular officers.

== World War II ==
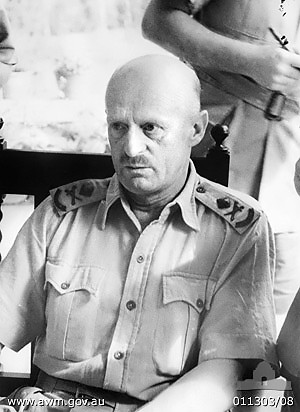
Bennett, briefing war correspondents in Malaya, January 1942

When World War II broke out in September 1939, although only 52, Bennett was passed over for command of the Second Australian Imperial Force, the position going to General Thomas Blamey. The Chief of the General Staff, General Sir Brudenell White, seems to have been opposed to Bennett being given an active command. In the Australian Dictionary of Biography (ADB), A. B. Lodge, Bennett's biographer, commented: "Because of his temperament, he was considered unsuitable for a semi-diplomatic command, and one that involved subordination to British generals. Bennett was as scathing of British officers as he was of Australian regulars."

Instead, Bennett was given a command in the Volunteer Defence Corps, the Australian version of the British Home Guard. In July 1940, he took over command of the Eastern Command Training Depot. After White's death in the Canberra air disaster in August 1940, Bennett was appointed commander of the newly formed 8th Division, replacing Vernon Sturdee, who was promoted to White's former role.

In February 1941, the 8th Division's headquarters, along with one of its brigades – the 22nd – was posted to Malaya after a request from the British for Australia to contribute troops to bolster the garrison there, amid growing concerns of war with the Japanese, and as part of the plans that had been formulated as the pre-war Singapore strategy. The 27th Brigade was also dispatched in August, but the division's third brigade, the 23rd Brigade remained in Australia. Relations between Bennett and his superiors, and also his subordinate brigade commander, Brigadier Harold Taylor, were not good. Lodge commented: "Bennett's dealings with British senior officers, especially with the general officer commanding, Malaya, Lieutenant General A.E. Percival, were devoid of harmony."

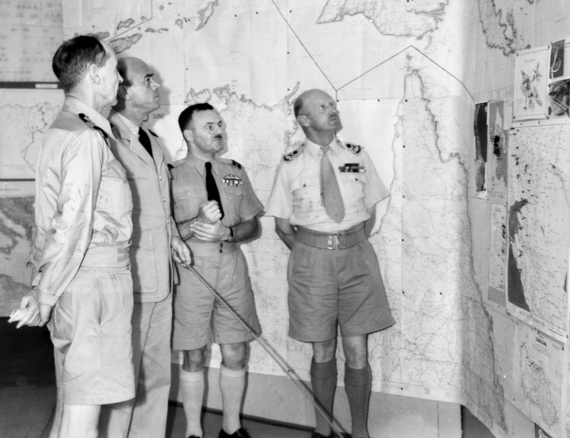
Air Commodore Raymond Brownell (second right), Lieutenant-General Bennett (far right) and Allied naval officers discussing an SWPA situation map, February 1943

In December 1941, the Japanese invasion of Malaya began. Bennett found himself in command of an ad hoc force known as "Westforce", which included the Australian 27th Brigade – but not the 22nd, which had been transferred to III Indian Corps – and several Indian units. Bennett's command was not engaged in the early stages of the fighting because the initial Japanese attacks fell on British and Indian units around Kota Bharu and the Thai–Malay border. However, as the Japanese pushed the defenders back and advanced into Johore, the Australians fought several actions throughout January. The most significant of those came around Gemas and Muar, in which the Australians experienced some local success before being forced to withdraw to Singapore at the end of the month, along with the rest of the Allied forces.

On Singapore, Bennett's command once again included the two Australian brigades – the 22nd and 27th – which were allocated the task of defending the north-western sector of the island. On 8 February 1942, the Japanese launched an assault across the Johore Strait, concentrating upon the sector held by Bennett's troops. The weight fell on the 22nd Brigade's area and, trying to fend off two Japanese divisions, they were eventually forced to withdraw towards the centre of the island. The 27th Brigade initially managed to hold its sector, but it was subjected to a follow-up assault on 10 February and, as the 22nd fell back, it was also forced to withdraw. Heavy fighting followed over the next week, but eventually the Allied troops were pushed across the island to Singapore's urban areas.

On 15 February, Percival began surrender negotiations with the Japanese. That night, Bennett decided that it was his duty to escape from Singapore rather than surrender. Consequently, he handed over command of the 8th Division to Brigadier Cecil Callaghan and, with a few junior officers and some local Europeans, Bennett commandeered a sampan and crossed the Strait of Malacca to the east coast of Sumatra. There, they transferred to a launch in which they sailed up the Batang Hari River, eventually proceeding by car to Padang, on the west coast of Sumatra. From there, Bennett flew to Java and then to Australia, arriving in Melbourne on 2 March 1942.

The fall of Singapore – the largest capitulation in British military history – shocked Australians, resulting in the capture of almost 15,000 Australians and many more Indian and British soldiers. Nevertheless, Bennett's escape was initially regarded as praiseworthy, at least publicly. Prime Minister John Curtin issued a statement that read:

I desire to inform the nation that we are proud to pay tribute to the efficiency, gallantry and devotion of our forces throughout the struggle. We have expressed to Major General Bennett our confidence in him. His leadership and conduct were in complete conformity with his duty to the men under his command and to his country. He remained with his men until the end, completed all formalities in connection with the surrender, and then took the opportunity and risk of escaping.

However, within the military, particularly its senior echelons, Bennett was criticised for leaving his troops. In April 1942, he was promoted to lieutenant general and given command of III Corps in Perth. At the time, it was an important post but, by 1943, as the possibility of a Japanese invasion of Australia faded, it became a backwater. Bennett was told by Blamey that he would not be given another active command, and Bennett was transferred to the Reserve of Officers in May 1944. He soon published his account of the Malayan campaign, Why Singapore Fell, which was critical of Percival and other British officers, although his opinions were later challenged by several Australian officers, including Callaghan. Blamey unsuccessfully tried to prevent the book's publication.

Upon retirement from active service, Bennett began writing for a Sydney newspaper and was a correspondent for the Australian Broadcasting Commission. He remained concerned about his soldiers, though, and met the first group of recently freed 8th Division prisoners of war when they arrived in Sydney on the transport Manunda. For their part, the majority of his former soldiers welcomed him, and some even hung a sign over the side of the ship, which read: "We want Bennett". They later put it in his car as a gesture of their support.

== Postwar inquiries ==
The controversy over Bennett's actions became public in mid-1945, when the war ended and Percival and Callaghan were released from Japanese captivity. Percival, who had never got on with Bennett, wrote a letter accusing him of relinquishing his command without permission. Callaghan delivered the letter to Blamey upon his release and Blamey convened a court of enquiry under Lieutenant General Leslie Morshead, and Major Generals Victor Stantke and George Wootten, which found that Bennett was not justified in handing over his command, or in leaving Singapore. Veterans of the 8th Division, who were generally loyal to Bennett, protested against this finding.

In November 1945, Prime Minister Ben Chifley appointed a Royal Commission under Justice G. C. Ligertwood. The Commission concluded that Bennett had disobeyed Percival's order to surrender. Lodge wrote:

While never questioning Bennett's personal courage, Ligertwood concluded that his action had been unjustified. Bennett's stated reason for leaving Singapore was that he had learned how to defeat the Japanese (but had been let down by British and Indian troops) and he was obliged to communicate his knowledge to military authorities. Yet, he had proved no more proficient than other commanders in Malaya and his tactics were outdated. Just as important to him was his wish to lead the Australian army, a consuming aspiration which had been sharpened by not being given an early command. His prejudice against regular officers and his ambition clouded his professional judgement at the most important point in his career. When his most cherished goals were in tatters, he convinced himself that blame for his failure lay with others.

In 1948, Lieutenant Colonel Thomas Fry, a military lawyer, published the opinion: "The Royal Commissioner based his report on an interpretation of international law, and did not discuss General Bennett's action from the standpoint of Australian military law, which placed him under no inflexible obligation to remain on Singapore Island."

== Post military, retirement and death ==
Bennett later became an orchardist, purchasing a property and living at Glenorie in the Hills district on Sydney's North Western fringe, until 1955 when, due to deteriorating health following a coronary occlusion, he sold his orchard and moved to Dural, New South Wales. He travelled to Singapore in 1957 with his wife to attend the opening of the Kranji War Memorial and then in 1960, travelled to Japan to meet with officers who had fought in Malaya. He wrote a number of articles on military topics and served on the board of a number of companies. From 1960 to 1962, he was Chairman of Directors of MMI Insurance. He died on 1 August 1962 at Dural, survived by his wife and daughter. After a state funeral at St Andrew's Cathedral, his body was cremated. The diary that Bennett kept while serving in Malaya is held at the State Library of New South Wales.

Military offices
New command	General Officer Commanding-in-Chief III Corps; 1942–1944	Succeeded by Major General Horace Robertson
Preceded by Major General Vernon Sturdee	General Officer Commanding 8th Division; 1940–1942	Formation disbanded
