= 2/11th Field Regiment (Australia) =

Australian Army artillery regiment

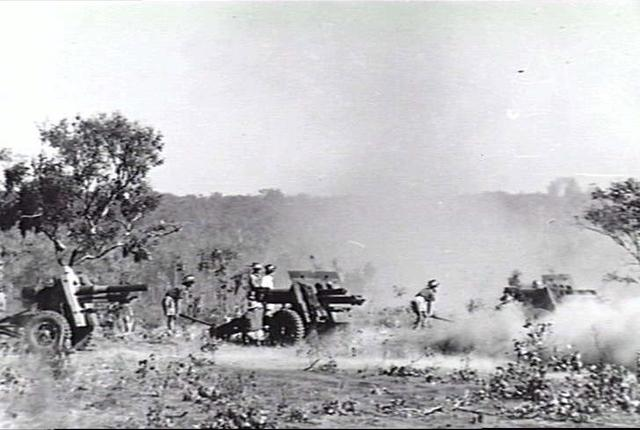
- 2/11th Field Regiment 25-pounders at practice, June 1943
- Active: 1940–45
- Country: Australia
- Type: Regiment
- Role: Artillery
- Size: 3 batteries
- Part of: 8th Division; I Australian Corps; 15th Brigade, 3rd Division
- Engagements: World War II: Syria–Lebanon Campaign; New Guinea Campaign; Bougainville Campaign

Insignia
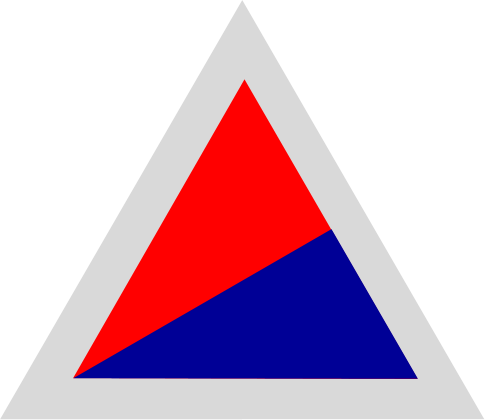
- Unit colour patch

The 2/11th Field Regiment was an Australian Army artillery regiment formed as part of the Second Australian Imperial Force during World War II. Formed in Victoria in mid-1940, the regiment was deployed to the Middle East in 1941 and subsequently took part in the fighting against the Vichy French in the Syria–Lebanon Campaign. In early 1942, they were brought back to Australia in response to Japan's entry into the war, and in 1943 joined the garrison in Darwin. Throughout 1944–45, the regiment was deployed to New Guinea before supporting the 3rd Division's campaign on Bougainville. After the war, the regiment was disbanded.

== History ==
Formed in July 1940 under the command of Lieutenant Colonel Leonard Stillman, the 2/11th Field Regiment initially consisted of two batteries – the 21st and 22nd – although later, in October 1941, a third battery, designated as the 61st, was raised. Upon formation, the regiment was assigned to the 8th Division, and after it was established in Richmond, Victoria, the regiment concentrated at Seymour, before joining the rest of the division at Bonegilla in September, where it was issued with World War I-vintage 18-pound guns. In October 1940, the regiment was transferred from the 8th Division to I Australian Corps, and moved to Puckapunyal where further training was completed prior to deployment overseas in April 1941.

Arriving in Egypt in May, the regiment was initially deployed to Palestine where further training was undertaken and more equipment, including more 18-pounders and several 4.5-inch howitzers. A short time later, these were replaced by 25-pounders when the regiment was committed to the Syria–Lebanon Campaign. As a corps unit, rather than one that was assigned at divisional level, it could be reallocated as necessary and for the campaign it was tasked with supporting the British 6th Division, which had been sent to the Middle East lacking the majority of the required supporting arms. They subsequently took part in the fighting in the Damascus sector and around Mezze. After the surrender of the Vichy forces, the regiment undertook garrison duties as part of the Allied occupation force before returning to Australia in March 1942, as the Australian government sought to bolster the country's defences in response to Japan's entry into the war.

Upon their return, the 2/11th concentrated around Woodford, Queensland, before moving to Darwin in the Northern Territory in early January 1943. They stayed in Darwin as part of the garrison there until September 1943, when they deployed to New Guinea where they were based around Nadzab, directly under the command of the First Australian Army. They remained there for the next seven months. In this time, the regiment was not assigned a combat role, and instead its personnel spent the time conducting jungle training and labouring tasks, being employed to expand and develop the Allied base that had been established at Nadzab to support operations in the Finisterre Ranges, and as stevedores in Lae.

In May 1945, they were transferred to II Australian Corps and transported to Torokina to take part in the Bougainville Campaign. Their deployment had been delayed by lack of shipping, but once they had arrived the regiment was assigned to the 3rd Division, and was allocated to support the 15th Brigade's advance towards the main Japanese base around Buin in the south. The regiment was heavily engaged between mid-May and early July when the Australian offensive came to an end amidst heavy rain and during this time the three batteries together fired over 18,000 rounds. Fire missions undertaken in this time included the provision of counter-battery and preparatory fires, and support to patrol operations with each of the regiment's batteries being individually assigned to one of the 15th Brigade's three infantry battalions. To ensure accurate support was provided forward observation officers were assigned to infantry patrols during this time; fires were also directed by spotter planes.

One member of the regiment, Lieutenant Colonel John Hayes – its commanding officer on Bougainville – was killed in action during the war, losing his life on 14 June 1945 when he and his scout party were ambushed while conducting a reconnaissance patrol; other casualties included 11 dead from non combat related causes on active service and 13 wounded. Decorations awarded amounted to two Military Crosses, one was to Philip Dietrich, and two Mentions in Despatches. The regiment was disbanded at the end of the war. Roughly 1,500 personnel served in the regiment's ranks over the course of the war.

== Commanding officers ==
The following officers commanded the 2/11th Field Regiment:

- Lieutenant Colonel Leonard Stillman (1940–43)
- Lieutenant Colonel James Entink (1943–45)
- Lieutenant Colonel John Hayes (1945);
- Lieutenant Colonel Brian Samson (1945).
