= 2/21st Battalion (Australia) =

- Active: 1940–1945
- Country: Australia
- Branch: Australian Army
- Type: Infantry
- Size: ~800–900 men
- Part of: 23rd Brigade, 8th Division
- Engagements: Second World War: Battle of Ambon

Insignia
- Unit colour patch

The 2/21st Battalion was an infantry battalion of the Australian Army. Raised during Second World War as part of the Second Australian Imperial Force, it was formed on 11 July 1940 at Trawool in central Victoria, as part of the 23rd Brigade of the 8th Division.

Following the Japanese invasion of Malaya, it was deployed to Ambon in December 1941 as part of Gull Force. However, with the defence of the island considered untenable, due to the limited military resources available and overwhelming Japanese strength, Ambon was surrendered on 3 February 1942, despite determined resistance. Most members of the battalion became prisoners of war, and a large number died in captivity.

== History ==
The 2/21st Battalion was formed on 11 July 1940 at Trawool in central Victoria as part of the Second Australian Imperial Force during the Second World War. Under the command of Lieutenant Colonel Leonard Roach, a Militia officer who had previously commanded the 14th Battalion, it was part of the 23rd Brigade of the 8th Division. The majority of the battalion's initial intake of volunteers were Victorians, drawn from the country areas around Shepparton as well as Melbourne. The colours chosen for the battalion's unit colour patch (UCP) were the same as those of the 21st Battalion, a unit which had served during World War I before being raised as a Militia formation in 1921. These colours were black over red, in a diamond shape, although a border of gray in an oval shape was added to the UCP to distinguish the battalion from its Militia counterpart; the oval border denoted that the battalion was an 8th Division unit.

With an authorised strength of around 900 personnel, like other Australian infantry battalions of the time, the battalion was formed around a nucleus of four rifle companies – designated 'A' through to 'D' – each consisting of three platoons. Initially hampered by limited equipment and stores, the battalion undertook rudimentary training at Trawool until 23 September, the battalion moved on foot to Bonegilla, a march of 235 kilometres (146 mi) which it completed by 4 October. At Bonegilla, the battalion concentrated with the 23rd Brigade's other two battalions, the 2/22nd and 2/23rd, and as more equipment became available, more complex training began. Training continued until 23 March 1941. While the 8th Division's two other brigades – the 22nd and 27th – were deployed to Malaya in 1941 to bolster the garrison there, the Australian government decided to keep the 23rd in Australia, to deploy to the islands to Australia's immediate north – Ambon, Timor and Rabaul – if war broke out with the Japanese. Within this plan, the 2/21st was earmarked to reinforce Dutch troops on Ambon if the Japanese decided to attack and the battalion subsequently moved to Darwin in the Northern Territory as the likelihood of war with Japan grew.

The battalion began arriving in Darwin on 9 April 1941 and spent the next nine months training and on garrison duties; however, the amenities were isolated and uncomfortable and preparations were hampered through a lack of equipment. Following the Japanese invasion of Malaya on 8 December the battalion prepared to move, arriving on Ambon on 17 December as part of Gull Force. Under Roach's command Gull Force consisted of the 2/21st Battalion supported by anti-tank artillery, engineers and other supporting arms with a combined strength of 1,100 men. Meanwhile, Netherlands East Indies forces on the island numbered some 2,600 men, including several companies of Indonesian troops and Dutch coastal artillery. These troops were tasked with defending the Bay of Ambon and the airfields at Laha and Liang which were being used by a small number of Dutch and some Australian aircraft from No. 13 Squadron RAAF. Yet with the small Australian and Dutch force totaling just 3,700 men, Roach believed Ambon unable to be defended with the limited military resources available and he urgently requested reinforcement. He was subsequently relieved of his command, and was replaced by Lieutenant Colonel John Scott on 17 January 1942. Just prior to the Japanese landings Scott altered the location of many of his defensive positions, which resulted in the battalion being less prepared to repel the invasion.

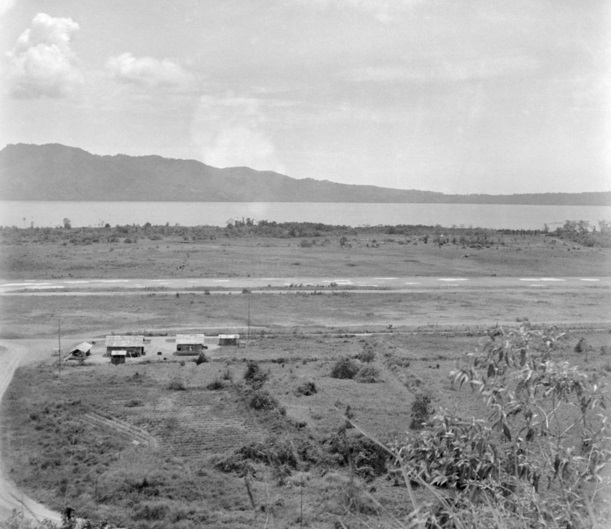
Laha airfield, as shown in December 1945, where the 2/21st had fought in 1942

On the evening of 30/31 January 1942 three battalions from 228th Infantry Regiment of the 38th Division and a battalion of marines from the 1st Kure Special Naval Landing Force landed at several locations on the north and south coast of the island. On the afternoon of 31 January Dutch forces around Paso had surrendered. Outnumbered and lacking air or naval support the 2/21st Battalion, which was guarding Ambon itself, was unable to prevent the advance despite determined resistance, and were pushed to the far west of the peninsula. With 24 hours of the landing Dutch forces on the island had capitulated. Meanwhile, B and C Companies of the 2/21st Battalion at Laha Airfield were attacked on 31 January. Around 150 Australian soldiers and some Indonesians and Dutch were subsequently captured and many were later massacred following a major Japanese offensive on 2 February. Meanwhile, the remainder of the battalion under Scott, located around Eri, surrendered the following day and were interned in their former barracks at Tan Tui.

Gull Force lost 15 men killed during the defence of Ambon, and another 309 men at Laha who were either killed in action or murdered by the Japanese in mass executions which occurred on 6 February and between 15 and 20 February. Although several small parties managed to escape Ambon and return to Australia, at least 791 men of the former garrison were captured. The survivors subsequently went into captivity as prisoners of war for the remainder of the conflict. Conditions for the prisoners on Ambon were poor and they suffered the highest death rate of any group of Australian prisoners of war during the conflict. Meanwhile, some members of the battalion, including the majority of medical personnel were transferred by the Japanese to camps on Hainan Island in October 1942. Following the surrender of Japan in August 1945, the survivors began to be evacuated on 10 September 1945, with those on Hainan following two days later.

The battalion was disbanded later in 1945, having lost 661 dead and 12 wounded. Members of the battalion received the following decorations: one Officer of the Order of the British Empire, three Members of the Order of the British Empire, one George Medal and 14 Mentions in Despatches. In December 2020, one of the battalion's drivers, William Doolan, was posthumously awarded the Medal for Gallantry for his actions around Kudamati village, on Ambon, on 1 February 1942.

== Battle honours ==
The 2/21st Battalion received the following battle honours:

- Ambon; Laha; and South-West Pacific 1942.

== Commanding officers ==
The following officers commanded the 2/21st Battalion during the war:

- Lieutenant Colonel Leonard Nairn Roach MC (17 June 1940 – 16 January 1942); and
- Lieutenant Colonel William John Scott (17 January – 3 February 1942 (in command); discharged August 1945).

== See also ==
- Sparrow Force
