= Second Australian Imperial Force =

Australian Army expeditionary force during World War II

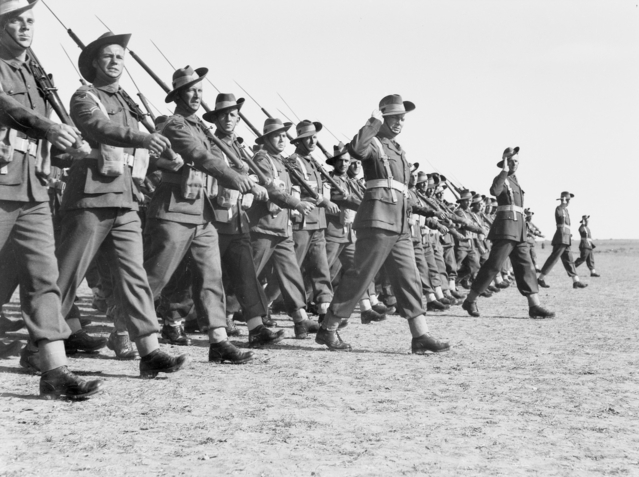
- Members of the 9th Division parade at Gaza Airport in late 1942
- Active: 1939–1947
- Country: Australia
- Branch: Australian Army
- Role: Expeditionary warfare
- Size: 307,000
- Nickname: 2nd AIF
- Engagements: World War II: Middle East; North African Campaign; Greece and Crete Campaigns; Syria–Lebanon Campaign; Pacific; Malaya Campaign; Dutch East Indies; New Guinea Campaign; Borneo Campaign

Commanders
- Notable commanders: Sir Thomas Blamey

The Second Australian Imperial Force (2nd AIF, or Second AIF) was the volunteer expeditionary force of the Australian Army in the Second World War. It was formed following the declaration of war on Nazi Germany, with an initial strength of one infantry division and related auxiliary components. After considerable expansion of this force, three divisions were sent to the Middle East and North Africa, while the 8th Division was sent to garrison British Malaya and Singapore.

Under the Defence Act 1903, neither the part-time Militia nor the full-time Permanent Military Force (PMF) could serve outside Australia or its territories unless they volunteered to do so. The Second AIF fought against Nazi Germany, Italy, Vichy France and Japan. After the war, Australia's wartime military structures were demobilised and the 2nd AIF was disbanded, although a small cadre of its personnel became part of the Interim Army that was established in 1947, and from which the Australian Regular Army was formed in 1948.

== Formation ==
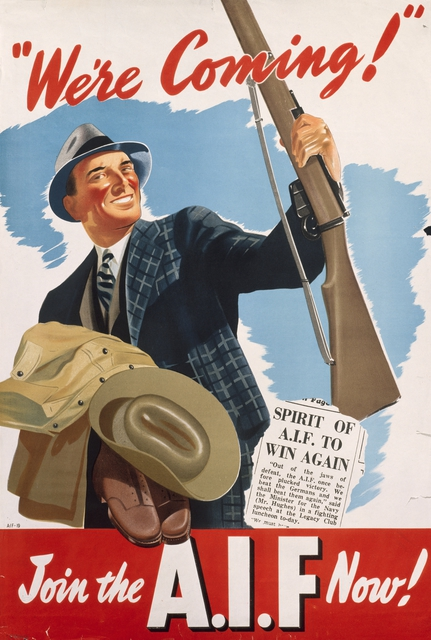
A Second AIF recruiting poster

At the outset of World War II, there was controversy over whether Australia should concentrate on forming an expeditionary force for overseas service to fight Germany in Europe or a home defence force to fight Japan. Prime Minister Robert Menzies decided to do both, although the experience of the Great War indicated that Australia did not have the resources to do either.

=== Conscription ===
On 15 September 1939, Menzies announced the formation of the Second AIF, an expeditionary force of 20,000, to consist of one infantry division and any auxiliary units that the Australian Army could fit into it. On 15 November 1939, Menzies announced the reintroduction of conscription for home defence service effective 1 January 1940. Unmarried men turning 21 in the year ending 30 June 1940 would be drafted into the Militia. Because of this, the AIF could not accept personnel who were in reserved occupations.

=== Public opinion and the Australian Militia ===
Although the AIF had priority for scarce personnel and equipment over the Militia, many Militia commanders were reluctant to release any to the AIF. Although the government had hoped that half of the new force would be drawn from the Militia, it was soon clear that this would not be achieved. The public was torn between the dangers presented by Germany and Japan. After an initial rush, enlistments tapered off. For these reasons, the Second AIF possessed only one division, the 6th Division, for nearly a year.

=== The fall of France ===
The fall of France shocked both the government and the people into action. A huge surge of enlistments—48,496 in June 1940—provided enough personnel to fill not only the recently formed 7th Division, but also to form the 8th and 9th Divisions as well, and the government ordered units to the United Kingdom to assist in its defence.

== Organisation ==
=== Command ===
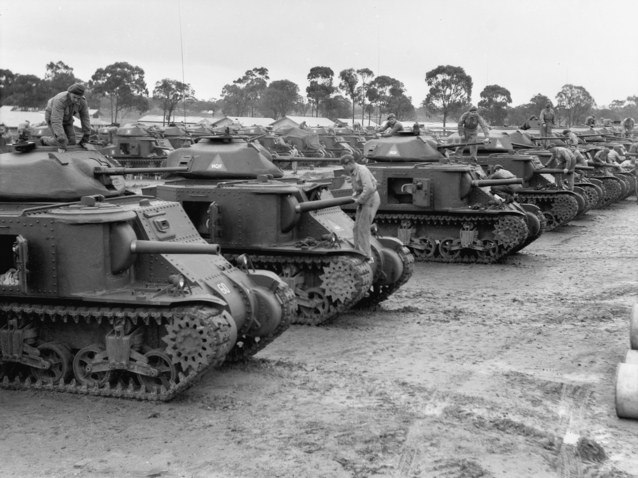
1st Armoured Division M3 Grant tanks in June 1942

Lieutenant General Thomas Blamey was given command of the Second AIF on 13 October 1939 and retained it throughout the war. As such, he was answerable directly to the Minister of Defence, rather than to the Military Board. He was given a charter based on that given to Major General William Throsby Bridges in 1914. Part of his charter required the Second AIF to be kept together, but a series of political and military crises resulted in the divisions rarely fighting together, with individual divisions, brigades and even battalions deployed in different sectors or even different theatres. This resulted in conflicts with British commanders, particularly the Commander-in-Chief Middle East, General Sir Claude Auchinleck, most notably over the relief of Tobruk.

The 6th and 7th Divisions departed for the Far East in January 1942, followed by the 9th Division in February 1943. The last AIF units, three forestry companies, returned via the United States in late 1943. All units of the Second AIF were thereafter deployed to the South West Pacific theatre, although some individuals remained in other theatres on exchange or liaison duty, such as Vernon Sturdee, who was head of the Australian Military Mission in Washington, D.C. from 1942 to 1944.

A controversial decision of the Menzies government was that senior commands in Blamey's 6th Division would be restricted to Militia officers. This upset many PMF officers. However, when the 7th Division was formed in May 1940, a regular officer, Lieutenant General John Lavarack was appointed to command it. Blamey appointed two regulars, Major Generals Vernon Sturdee and Henry Wynter to command the 8th and 9th Divisions, but Wynter became ill and Sturdee was appointed Chief of the General Staff following the death of General Sir Brudenell White in the 1940 Canberra air disaster. The commands then went to two CMF soldiers, Major Generals Gordon Bennett and Leslie Morshead.

=== Structure ===
The Second AIF's main strength consisted of a Corps Headquarters and five divisions:

- 6th Division
- 7th Division
- 8th Division
- 9th Division
- 1st Armoured Division

Divisions numbered 1st to 5th were Militia divisions, which had been raised during the inter-war years and perpetuated the numerical designations of the First AIF units that had fought during the First World War. In addition, the 10th through 12th and the 2nd and 3rd Armoured Divisions were also Militia formations.

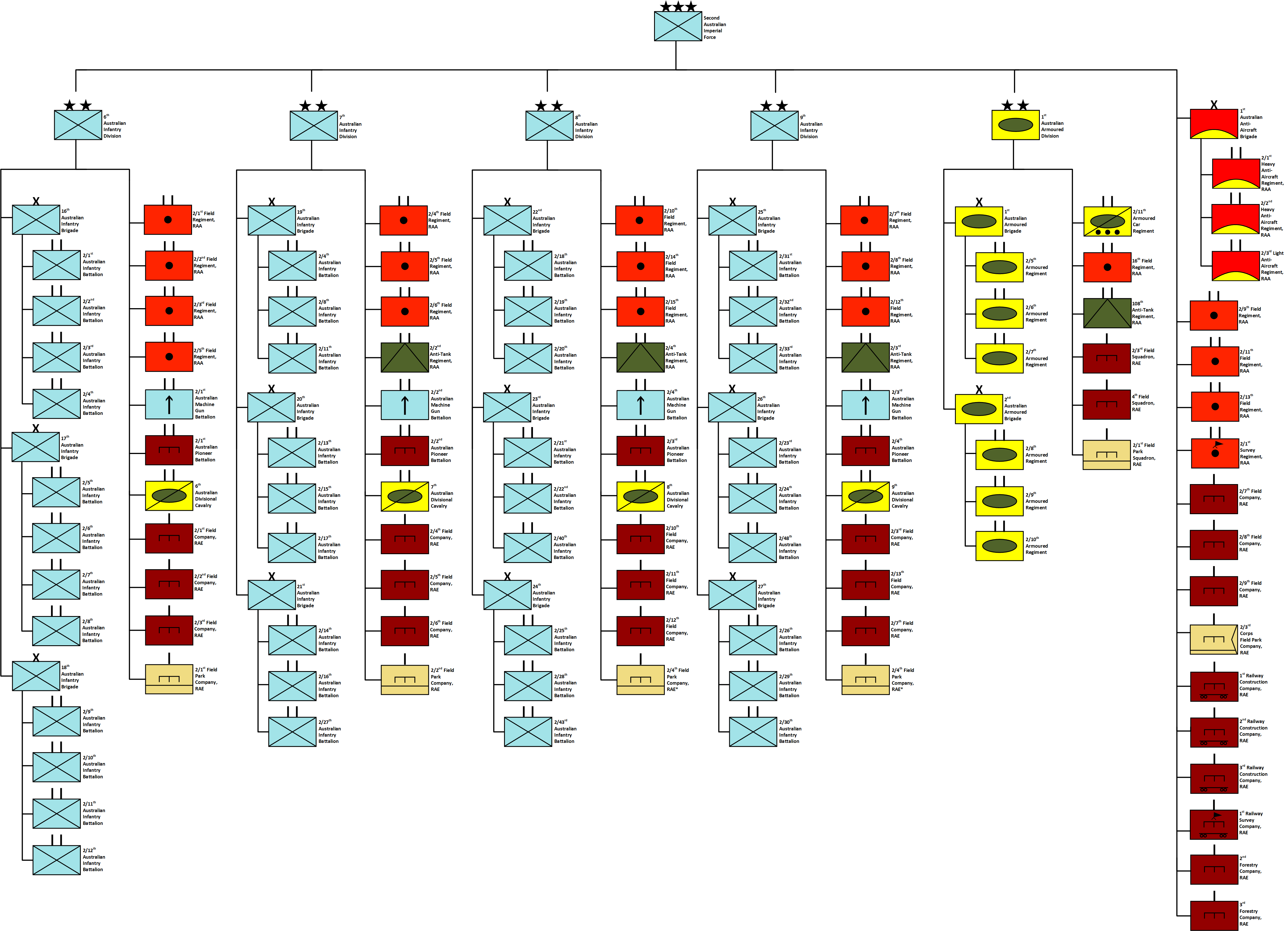
Organization at the outset of World War 2

There were three brigades in each division. Brigades were numbered from 16 onwards so as not to be confused with extant Militia brigades. There were at first four infantry battalions per brigade but this was soon reduced to three.

Units of the Second AIF prefixed their numbers with a '2/' (pronounced 'second') to distinguish themselves from Militia units. Where such a unit did not exist in the First AIF or the Militia, the '2/' was not initially used, but later it was adopted as identifying a unit of the Second AIF.

After the war with Japan began, large numbers of experienced AIF officers were posted to Militia units. As a consequence, units in which more than 75% of their personnel were AIF volunteers were permitted to call themselves AIF units. By November 1944, 20 of the Militia's 33 infantry battalions were entitled to call themselves AIF. At this time the Army was 423,000 strong, of whom 25,000 were women, and 307,000 were members of the AIF.

In the South West Pacific, the Army found that its force structure was unbalanced, with a preponderance of operational units and a grave shortage of logistical units. The Army was also faced with government requests to release manpower to industry, and later to discharge long-serving personnel. This was remedied by disbanding operational units.

From 1 May 1945, the Army's monthly quota was 420 men and 925 women. As its wastage was greater than this, units were disbanded for reinforcements.

== Weaponry and equipment ==
Unlike in 1914, Australia did not possess a stock of modern weapons and equipment at the outbreak of the war. As in 1914, the British Army was unable to help much in the initial stages, as it was preoccupied with its own mobilisation. The Treasury Department opposed the diversion of large numbers of men and women from industry, the conversion of industries to production of weapons, and the expenditure of large sums on defence. It took time for the Army to overcome its objections, and modern weapons, such as the 25 pounder, were soon coming off the assembly lines in Australia. In the meantime, the AIF, like the Militia, made do with the weapons that the First AIF had brought back from the Great War.

=== Armour ===
The 1st Armoured Division was formed at Puckapunyal in 1941 after the German blitzkrieg had demonstrated the value of armour in modern warfare.

== Personnel ==
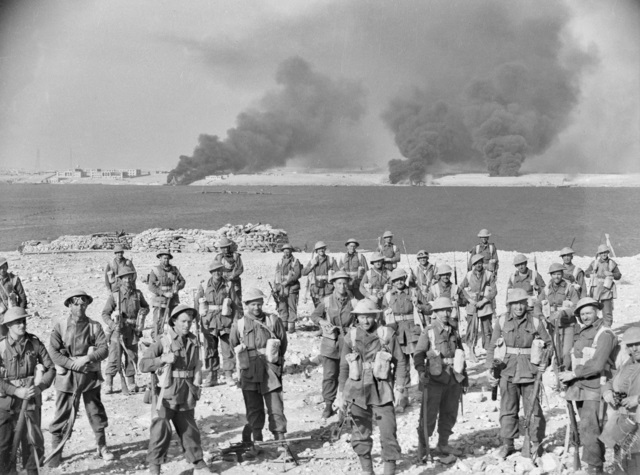
Infantrymen from the 6th Division at Tobruk, January 1941

Personnel were required to be between 20 and 35 years old on enlistment, although there were many cases of this being evaded. A large number of personnel were aged 20 on enlistment, and many former members of the First AIF joined up, a practice encouraged by some unit commanders, who liked to have some old hands around.

=== Pay ===
Although volunteer militiamen were paid 8s per day, an unmarried private in the AIF was paid 5s per day in Australia, with an extra 2s per day after embarkation for overseas. This was less than the 8s 6d per day dole, not to mention the average basic wage of £2 16s.

=== Serial numbers ===
All members of the Second AIF were allocated a serial number. The first letter represented the state of enlistment: N – New South Wales; V – Victoria; Q – Queensland; S – South Australia; W – Western Australia; T – Tasmania; D ("Darwin") – Northern Territory; P - Papua New Guinea. The serial numbers of female soldiers followed this with an F. AIF serial numbers then had an X. A low number indicated an early enlistment. General Blamey was VX1. Soldiers transferring from the Militia often kept their old number with 100,000 added, while PMF officers had 20,000 added.

=== Women in the AIF ===
From the first, women served with the AIF in the Australian Army Nursing Service. The Australian Army Medical Women's Service was formed in 1942, and the Australian Women's Army Service on 13 August 1941. The latter had a strength of 24,000. Some 35,000 women served in the Army, making up about 5% of the force.

== Uniforms and insignia ==
=== Shoulder patches ===
Units wore the shoulder patch of the corresponding unit of the First AIF, with a grey border to distinguish the unit from the Militia unit wearing the same patch. The shape of the grey indicated the division, which sometimes differed from that of the coloured part. Later, AIF personnel in Militia units were authorised to wear the grey border, resulting in some units wearing the same patches. The 9th Division replaced all its patches with a new type in the shape of a "T". As there were more units in the Second AIF than the First, many units wore patches of a new design.

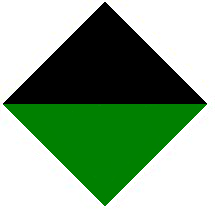
17th Battalion 1921–1944

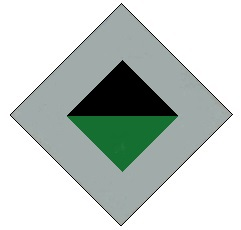
2/17th Battalion 1940–1942

2/17th Battalion 1942–1946

== Operations ==
The 6th Division, under Major General Iven Mackay fought in the Western Desert campaign at Bardia, Tobruk and Benghazi. It experienced many casualties in the Greek campaign, where 3,000 Australian soldiers were taken prisoner.

After refitting in Syria, the 6th Division was recalled to Australia to take part in the Pacific War in February 1942. Its 16th and 17th Infantry Brigades were temporarily diverted to garrison Ceylon. The 19th Infantry Brigade was sent to Darwin, except for its 2/11th Infantry Battalion, which went to Western Australia.

When the remainder of the 6th Division returned, it was committed to the fighting in New Guinea. The 16th Infantry Brigade participated in the fighting on the Kokoda Track and at Buna. The 17th Infantry Brigade fought in the Battle of Wau and the Salamaua campaign.

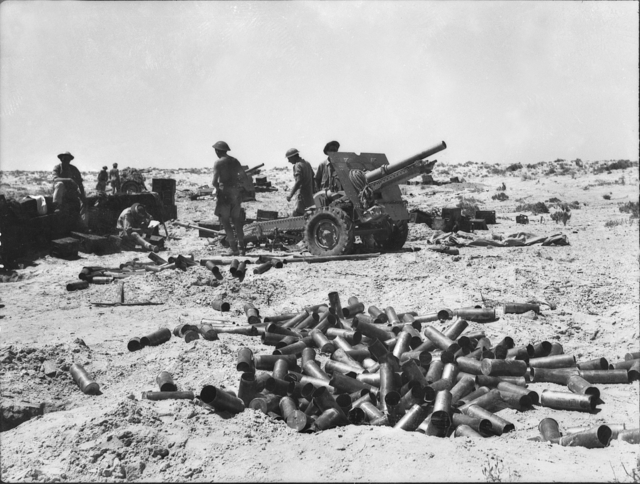
Guns of the 2/8th Field Regiment at El Alamein in July 1942

The 7th Division, under Major General Arthur Allen and other Australian units formed the body of the Allied invasion of Lebanon and Syria in 1941. The division's 18th Infantry Brigade fought at Tobruk.

Following the outbreak of war in the Pacific, elements of the 7th Division were sent to the Dutch East Indies, reinforcing a few 8th Division units. The bulk of the 7th Division was deployed in support of Militia battalions engaged in a rearguard action on the Kokoda Track Campaign in New Guinea. With elements of the 1st Armoured Division and 6th Divisions, and Militia, it formed a large part of the Allied forces which destroyed the major Japanese beachhead in New Guinea, at the Battle of Buna-Gona.

Most of the 8th Division was sent to Malaya to strengthen the garrison prior to war with Japan, while the remaining battalions were deployed in the Dutch East Indies and New Guinea. Consequently, most of the division was lost at the Fall of Singapore in February 1942, where the division lost 1,789 killed and 1,306 wounded; another 15,395 were captured. The divisional commander, Major General Henry Gordon Bennett created an enduring controversy by escaping.

A small, lesser-known force known as Mission 204 was drawn from units in Malaya, including forty men of the 8th Division. It served in China, advising the Chinese Army, until it was withdrawn in October 1942.

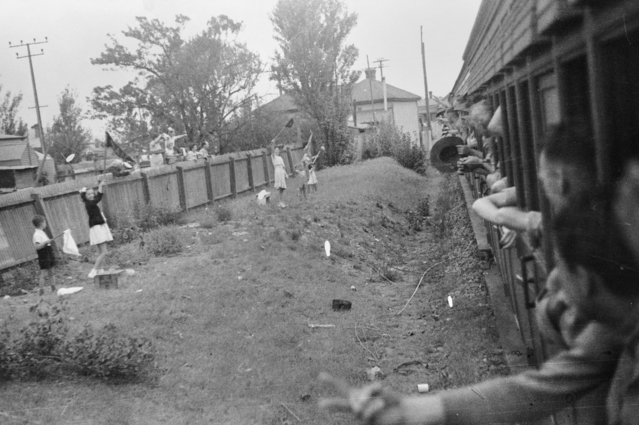
Troops from the 7th Division are cheered by civilians as their train passes through Adelaide in March 1942

The 23rd Infantry Brigade remained, but without battalions, as these had been lost when Ambon, Rabaul and Timor fell. It was filled up with Militia battalions, and it and other remaining elements of the 8th Division participated in the campaigns in the South West Pacific. The 8th Division was reformed after the war to process prisoners of the Japanese.

Australian prisoners of war, like other Allied prisoners of the Japanese, were often held in inhumane conditions, such as Changi Prison or in Japan. Some were subject to forced labour, including the Burma Railway or forced long distance marches, such as on Sandakan.

AIF Independent companies continued guerrilla operations in East Timor for many months until being evacuated in January 1943. Independent companies played an important part in the defence of New Guinea, initially occupying several locations to Australia's north to provide an early warning capability in the months prior to the outbreak of the Pacific War, and then, after the fighting had started, fighting several delaying campaigns in Timor, New Guinea, and New Britain. Later in the war, these units were converted into "commando" units, subsequently fighting several campaigns in New Guinea, Bougainville and Borneo.

The 9th Division fought in the North African campaign under Major General Leslie Morshead and distinguished itself first at the Battle of Tobruk, where it became the first Allied unit to resist German Blitzkrieg tactics. The Axis leader in North Africa, Lieutenant General Erwin Rommel, described the 9th Division at Tobruk as: "immensely big and powerful men, who without question represented an elite formation of the British Empire, a fact that was also evident in battle."

The 9th also served with distinction at the First and Second Battles of El Alamein. It returned to Australia in early 1943 in a convoy operation designated Operation Pamphlet.

In 1943, the 6th, 7th and 9th Divisions were reunited on the Atherton Tableland.

General Douglas MacArthur, Supreme Allied Commander in the South West Pacific Area depended on the AIF as the spearhead of his land forces in 1942 and 1943. The 7th Division, now under Major General George Vasey, fought at Nadzab and in the Finisterre Range campaign. Meanwhile, the 9th Division, now under Major General George Wootten fought at Red Beach and then in the Huon Peninsula campaign.

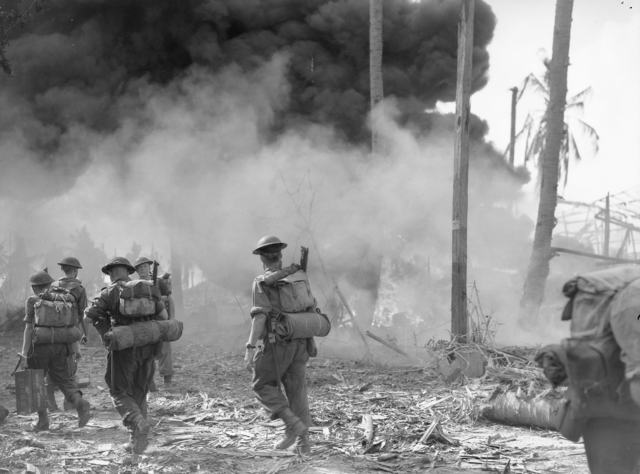
Members of the 7th Division at Balikpapan in July 1945

MacArthur deployed the AIF divisions in secondary assignments during 1944–45, where they often fought what many considered to be pointless battles. A shortage of first operational units and then logistic units caused the 6th Division, now under Major General Jack Stevens to be committed to the Aitape-Wewak campaign despite MacArthur's efforts. He employed the 7th and 9th Divisions in the Borneo Campaign (1945).

A planned invasion of the Japanese home island of Honshū in 1946, Operation Coronet, would almost certainly have included an "Australian 10th Division", made up of experienced personnel from the three existing divisions. However, the Japanese surrendered before the invasion took place.

== Disbandment ==
Most Second AIF personnel were demobilised by the end of 1946. The Second AIF ceased to exist on 30 June 1947. All Second AIF personnel still on full-time duty were transferred to the Interim Army on 1 July 1947; this force was used to form the foundation of the Australian Regular Army in 1948.
