= List of Japanese-run internment camps during World War II =

This is an incomplete list of Japanese-run military prisoner-of-war and civilian internment and concentration camps during World War II. Some of these camps were for prisoners of war (POW) only. Some also held a mixture of POWs and civilian internees, while others held solely civilian internees.

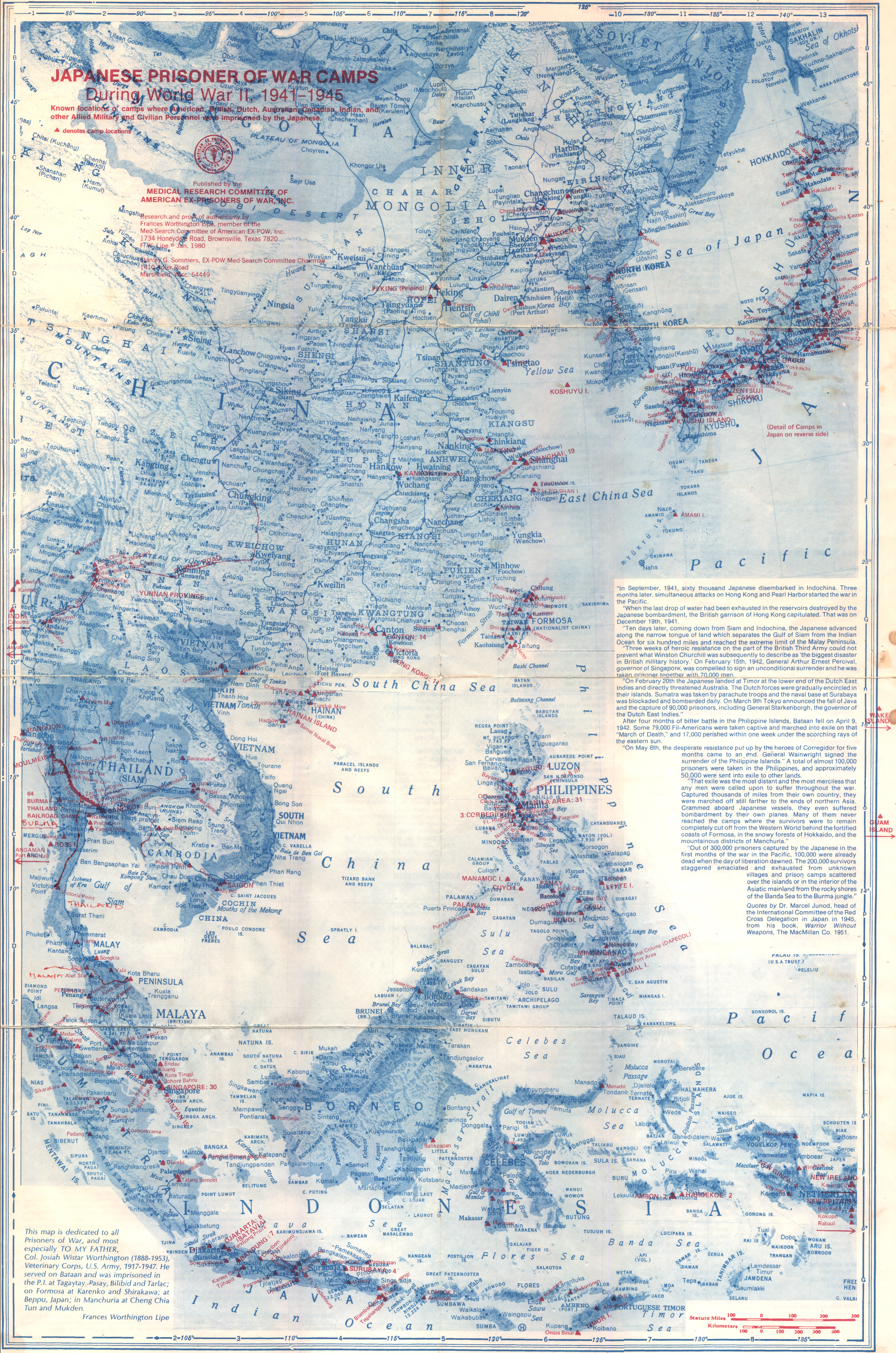
A map (front) of Imperial Japanese-run prisoner-of-war camps within the Greater East Asia Co-Prosperity Sphere known during World War II from 1941 to 1945.

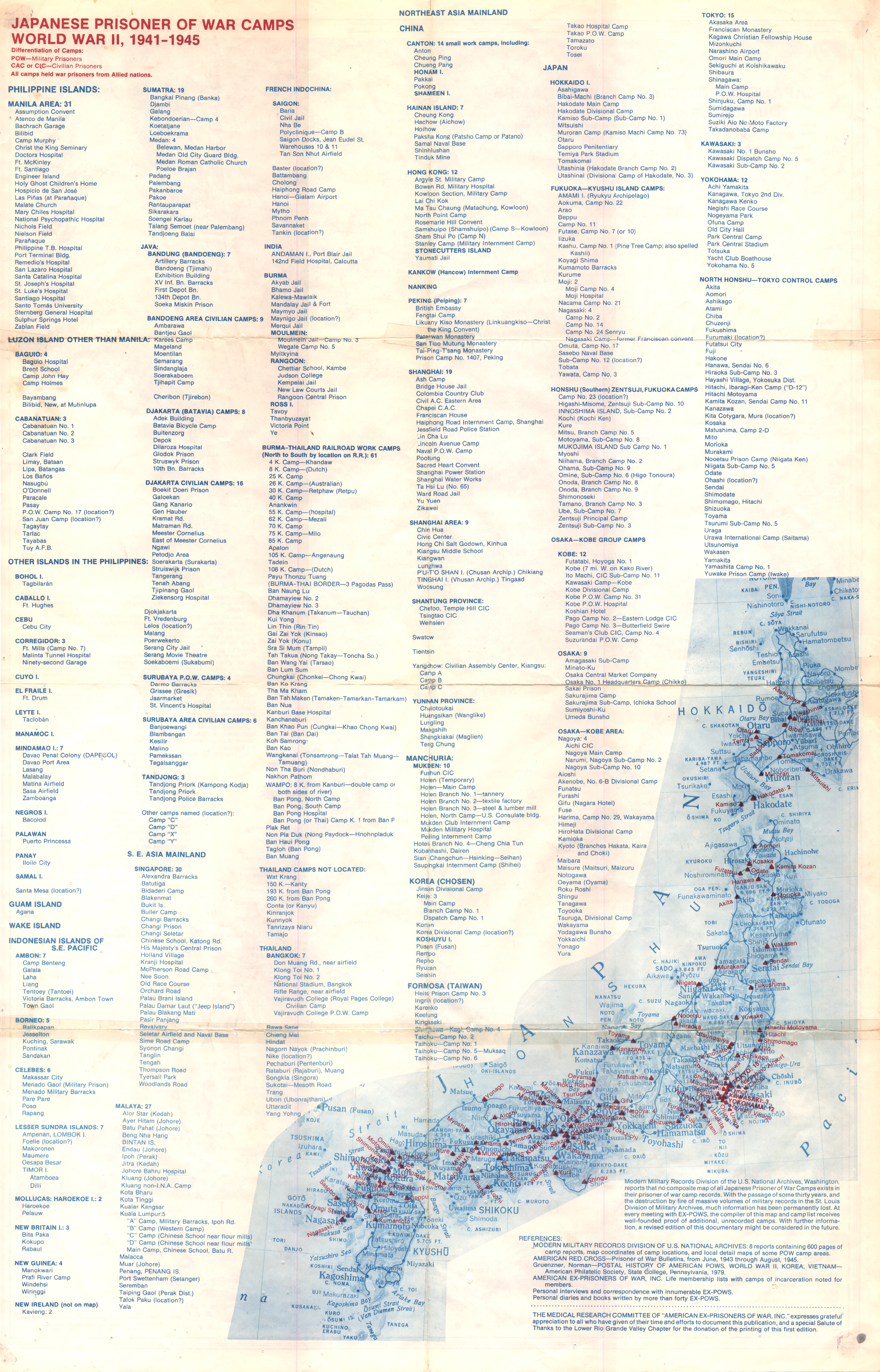
Back of map of Imperial Japanese-run prisoner-of-war camps with a list of the camps categorized geographically and an additional detailed map of camps located on the Japanese archipelago.

Published by the Medical Research Committee of American Ex-Prisoners of War, Inc., 1980.

== Philippines ==
- Cabanatuan
- Davao Prison and Penal Farm
- Camp O'Donnell
- Los Baños
- Santo Tomas Internment Camp
- Bilibid Prison
- Puerto Princesa Prison Camp
- Camp John Hay
- Camp Holmes Internment Camp
- Camp Manganese, Guindulman, Bohol
- Camp Malolos, Bulacan

== Malaya and the Straits Settlements (Singapore) ==
- Changi Prison, Singapore
- Selarang Barracks, Singapore
- River Valley Camp, Singapore
- Blakang Mati, Sentosa, Singapore
- Outram Road Prison, Singapore
- Sime Road, Singapore
- No 2 and no 5 detached camp, Port Dickson, Malaya
- No 1 detached camp, Kuala Lumpur, Malaya - possibly Pudu Prison
- Unit 9420

== Formosa (Taiwan) ==
- Kinkaseki#1
- Taichu#2 (Taichung)
- Heito#3 (Pingtung)
- Shirakawa#4 (Chiayi)
- Taihoku#5 Mosak (Taipei)
- Taihoku#6 (Taipei)
- Karenko (Hualien)
- Tamazato (Yuli)
- Kukutsu (Taipei)
- Oka (Taipei)
- Toroku (Touliu)
- Inrin (Yuanlin)
- Inrin Temporary (Yuanlin)
- Takao (Kaohsiung)
- Churon (Taipei)
- Tiahokum (Taipei)
- Taihoku Prison
- Giran (Yilan)
- Maruyama

== British Borneo (Brunei and East Malaysia) ==
- Batu Lintang camp (Batu Lintang, Kuching)
- Jesselton camp (Kota Kinabalu)
- Sandakan camp (Sandakan)

== China ==
- Ash Civilian Assembly Center (Shanghai)
- Chapei Civilian Assembly Center (Shanghai)
- Columbia Country Club Civilian Assembly Center (Shanghai)
- Fengtai Prison
- Kiangwang POW Camp
- Lunghua Civilian Assembly Center (Shanghai)
- Lushun (Port Arthur) POW Camp
- Pokong Civilian Assembly Center (Honan Island, Canton)
- Unit 1855 (Beijing)
- Unit 1644 (Nanjing)
- Unit 8604 (Guangzhou)
- Unit 543 (Hailar District)
- Wusong POW Camp (Wusong, Shanghai)
- Weixian Civil Assembly Center (Wei County, near Weifang)
- Yu Yuen Road Civilian Assembly Center (Shanghai)
- Yangtzepoo Civilian Assembly Center (Shanghai)
- Zikawei Camp

== Manchukuo (Manchuria) ==
- Hoten Camp
- Harbin Camp
- Mukden POW Camp
- Unit 731
- Unit 100
- Unit 516
- Zhongma Fortress

== Dutch East Indies (Indonesia) ==
Japanese Internment Camps in Dutch East Indies (now Indonesia):

- Aek Pamienke (3 camps), Rantau Prapat, North Sumatra
- Ambon (Ambon Island)
- Ambarawa (2 camps), Central Java
- Balikpapan POW camp, Balikpapan (Dutch Borneo)
- Bangkong, Semarang, Central Java
- Banjoebiroe (Semarang), Central Java
- Bicycle Camp, Batavia, West Java
- Brastagi (internment camp) Berastagi, North Sumatra
- Fort van den Bosch, Ngawi, East Java
- Glodok prison, Glodok, a suburb of Batavia, West Java
- Gloegoer (Glugur), Medan, North Sumatra
- Grogol, Batavia, West Java
- Kampili camp, near Makassar, South Celebes (today Sulawesi)
- Kampoeng Makasar, Meester Cornelis, West Java
- Camp Kareës, Bandung, West Java
- Koan School, Batavia (today Jakarta), West Java
- Lampersari, Semarang, Central Java
- Makasoera, Celebes
- Moentilan, Magelang, Central Java
- Poeloe Brayan (5 camps) (Pulo Brayan), Medan, North Sumatra
- Pontianak POW camp, Pontianak (Dutch Borneo) (today Kalimantan)
- Si Rengo Rengo (Siringo-ringo), Labuhanbatu, North Sumatra
- Tandjong Priok POW camp, Tandjong Priok, Batavia, West Java
- Tebing Tinggi, North Sumatra
- Tjideng, Batavia, West Java
- Tjibaroesa, Buitenzorg (now part of Bekasi), West Java
- Klapanoenggal, Buitenzorg, West Java
- Tjimahi (6 camps), West Java
- Usapa Besar, Timor

== Thailand and Burma (Myanmar) ==
- Anakwin 45 Kilo Camp from Thanbyuzayat
- Apalon 82 Kilo Campfrom Thanbyuzayat
- Aungganaung 105 Kilo Camp from Thanbyuzayat
- Ban Kao 88 km from Nong Pladuc
- Ban Pong 3 km from Nong Pladuc
- Chungkai 60 km from Nong Pladuc
- Hellfire Pass 152 km from Nong Pladuc
- Hintok 154 km from Nong Pladuc
- Kanchanaburi 53 km from Nong Pladuc
- Khonkhan 55 Kilo Camp from Thanbyuzayat
- Kinsaiyok 171 km from Nong Pladuc
- Konkoita 262.5 km from Nong Pladuc
- Konyu 152 km from Nong Pladuc
- Mezali 70 Kilo Camp from Thanbyuzayat
- Nam Chon Yai 229 km from Nong Pladuc
- Nakhon Nayok 2 camps: Officers and ORs
- Nikki 282 km from Nong Pladuc
- Nong Pladuk Nong Pladuc, Thailand 0 km
- Paya Thanzu Taung 108 Kilo Camp from Thanbyuzayat
- Prang Kasi 211 km from Thanbyuzayat
- Rephaw 30 Kilo Camp from Thanbyuzayat
- Sonkrai (Songkurai) 294 km from Nong Pladuc
- Tamarkan 56 km from Nong Pladuc
- Tampi 148 km from Nong Pladuc
- Tarsao 125 km from Nong Pladuc
- Taungzun 60 Kilo Camp from Thanbyuzayat
- Tha Khanun (Takanun) 218 km from Nong Pladuc
- Tha Kilen 98 km from Nong Pladuc
- Tha Mayo 237 km from Nong Pladuc
- Tha Muang 39 km from Nong Pladuc
- Tha Rua 26 km from Nong Pladuc
- Thanbaya 53 Kilo Camp from Thanbyuzayat
- Thanbyuzayat 0 Kilo Camp, Burma. 415 km from Nong Pladuc
- Three Pagodas Pass 108.5 km from Thanbyuzayat
- Tonchan South 125 km from Nong Pladuc
- Wang Lan 69 km from Nong Pladuc
- Wang Pho 111 km from Nong Pladuc

== New Guinea ==
- Rabaul
- Oransbari - Civilian internment camp. Alamo Scouts liberated a family of 14 Dutch-Indos, a family of 12 French, and 40 Javanese on 5 Oct 1944. Zedric, Lance Q. Silent Warriors: The Alamo Scouts Behind Japanese Lines (Pathfinder 1995).

== Portuguese (East) Timor ==
- Baucau
- Dili

== Korea ==
- Inchon
- Seoul (Keijō)
- Hamhung

== Hong Kong ==
- Argyle Street Camp
- Ma Tau Chung Camp
- Ma Tau Wai Camp
- North Point Camp
- Sham Shui Po Camp
- Stanley Internment Camp

== Guam ==
- Manenggon

== Japan ==
- Achi Yamakita
- Aioshi
- Akasaka
- Akenobe #6B
- Akita
- Amagasaki Subcamp
- Aokuma (or Okuma) (Fukuoka #22)
- Aomori (Ōmori, Tokyo Base Camp #1)
- Arao
- Asahigawa
- Ashio
- Ashikago
- Atami
- Beppu
- Bibai-Machi Branch Camp #3
- Camp #11 (Fukuoka #11) (Later renamed #8)
- Camp #23
- Chiba
- Chugenji (or Chuzenji)
- Franciscan Monastery
- Fukuoka #17
- Fuji
- Funatsu
- Furashi
- Furumaki
- Fuse
- Futase (Fukuoka #10, later renamed #7)
- Futatsui City
- Gifu - Nagara Hotel
- Hakodate #2 (Utashinia or Akabira)
- Hakodate #3 (Utashin1a)
- Hakodate Divisional Camp
- Hakodate Main Camp
- Hakone
- Hanawa Sendai #6
- Harina (or Harima)
- Hayashi Village
- Higashi-Misone (Subcamp #10)
- Himeji
- Hiraoka (Subcamp #3)
- Hirohata Divisional Camp
- Hitachi (Ibaraki-Ken Camp #D12)
- Hitachi Motoyama
- Honshu, (Naniwa Camp)
- Ichioka (or Itchioka) Stadium Hospital
- Iizuka (Probably #7)
- Ikuno (Osaka #4B)
- Imoshima Island (Subcamp #2)
- Kagawa Christian Fellowship Home
- Kamioka
- Kamiso Subcamp #1
- Kamitan (or Kamita) Kozan (Sendai #11)
- Kanagawa Kenko
- Kanagawa Tokyo 2nd Div.
- Kanazawa
- Kanose
- Karuizawa
- Kashii (or Kashu) Camp #1 (Fukuoka #1)
- Kawasaki #1
- Kawasaki Camp - Kobe
- Kawasaki Dispatch Camp #5
- Kawasaki Subcamp #2 ("Mitsui Madhouse")
- Kempei Tai
- Kita Kurihara
- Kobe
- Kobe (Camp #31)
- Kobe POW Hospital
- Kōchi
- Kosaka (Sendai Camp #8)
- Koshian Hotel
- Koyagi Shima (Fukuoka #2)
- Kumamoto (First location of Fukuoka #1)
- Kure
- Kurume
- Kyota - branches at Hakata
- Maibara
- Maisure
- Minato-ku
- Mito
- Mitsu Branch Camp #5
- Mitsuishi
- Mitsushima (or Matsushima) Camp #2D
- Miyata (Fukuoka #9B)
- Mizumaki
- Mizonkuchi
- Moji #4
- Moji Hospital
- Morioka
- Motoyama Subcamp #8
- Mukaishima Island Subcamp #1 (Hiroshima Sub-Camp #4)
- Murakami
- Muroran (Kamiso Machi Camp #73)
- Myoshi
- Nakama #21 (Fukuoka #21) (Also spelled Nacama)
- Nagasaki
- Nagasaki #14
- Nagasaki #2 (Same as #139)
- Nagasaki #4
- Nagoya Main Camp
- Nagoya Subcamp #10
- Nakano
- Narashino Airport
- Narumi
- Niigata (Subcamp #5)
- Niihama Branch Camp #2
- Nogeyama Park
- Naoetsu Prison Camp (Niigata Ken)
- Notogawa #9B
- Odate
- Oeyama (or Oyama)
- Ōfuna Camp
- Ohama Subcamp #9
- Ohashi
- Old City Hall
- Omine Subcamp #6
- Ōmori Main Camp
- Ōmuta Camp #17 Fukuoka 17
- Onada Branch Camp #8
- Onada Branch Camp #9
- Osaka #1 Headquarters Camp (Chikko)
- Osaka Central Market
- Otaru
- Oyeama
- Park Central Camp
- Park Central Stadium
- Roku Roshi
- Sakai Prison
- Sakata Branch Camp, Yamagata (Sendai 9-B)
- Sakurajima
- Sakurajima Ichioka School
- Sapporo Penitentiary
- Sasebo (Fukuoka #18)
- Sekiguchi at Koishikawaku
- Sendai
- Shibaura
- Shimodate
- Shimomago Hitachi
- Shimonseki
- Shinagawa Main Camp
- Shinagawa POW Hospital
- Shingu
- Shinjuku Camp #1
- Shizuoka
- Subcamp #12 (Fukuoka #12)
- Sumidagawa
- Sumiyoshi-ku
- Suzuki Aio No Moto Factory
- Suzurandai
- Takadanobaba
- Tamano Branch Camp #3
- Tanagawa
- Tan Tui (or Tan tooey)
- Teniya (or Temiya) Park Stadium
- Tobata (Fukuoka #3)
- Tomakomai
- Toyama
- Toyoka (or Toyooka)
- Tsumori (Osaka Subcamp #13B)
- Tsuruga Divisional Camp #5B
- Tsurumi Subcamp #5
- Ube Subcamp #7
- Umeda Bonshu (Osaka Warehouse)
- Uraga
- Utsonomiya
- Uywake (or Iwake or Yuwake)
- Wakasen
- Wakayama
- Wakinohama (Osaka #18-B)
- Yamashita Camp #1
- Yodogawa
- Yokkaichi
- Yokohama #5
- Yonago
- Yura
- Zentsuji Headquarters Camp
- Zentsuji Subcamp #3

== See also ==
- List of World War II prisoner-of-war camps in Australia
- List of World War II prisoner-of-war camps in Canada
- List of World War II prisoner-of-war camps in Italy
- List of World War II prisoner-of-war camps in the United Kingdom
- List of World War II prisoner-of-war camps in the United States
