= 79th Light Anti-Aircraft Battery =

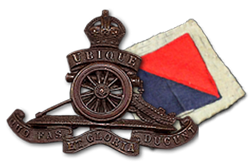
- Cap badge and anti-aircraft patch
- Active: 1939–1946
- Country: United Kingdom
- Branch: Royal Artillery
- Role: Anti-aircraft warfare
- Garrison/HQ: Walton-on-Thames
- Nickname: "The Sparrows"
- Motto: Quo Fas Et Gloria Ducunt
- March: "The British Grenadiers"
- Engagements: World War II: Battle of Britain; Battle of Timor; Battle of Java

The 79th Light Anti-Aircraft Battery, also known as "The Sparrows", was a Royal Artillery unit of the British Army that fought in the Battle of Britain, the Battle of Java, and the Battle of Timor.

== History ==
=== Formation ===
The 79th Light Anti-Aircraft Battery was an independent Territorial Army unit of the Royal Artillery of the British Army.

Formed in the winter of 1939, the 79th was initially based at Walton-on-Thames to defend critical installations, such as water reservoirs supplying London. Originally composed of London volunteers, the battery became a full-time unit in September 1939 when war with Germany was declared. As with all Territorial Army units, the battery was absorbed into the regular army by the end of that month. With three other similar batteries, it became part of the 36th Light Anti-Aircraft Regiment.

=== Battle of Britain ===
During the first 2 years of World War II, the unit was employed on anti-aircraft protection duties in the Luftwaffe's Blitzes of London. This unit also saw action during the Battle of Britain where it served with distinction defending the Hawker Aviation factory at Langley, Churchill’s country home at Ditchley, and the oil refinery north of Bristol. Later, the 76th was used in the protection of airfields and key installations in Cornwall and the Isles of Scilly.

=== 21st Light Anti-Aircraft Regiment's formation ===
The battery converted to using Bofors 40 millimeter automatic anti-aircraft artillery. Additionally, the battery prepared to become mobile, as conscripted 19-year-old cockney drivers were being trained in Blackpool. Replacement gunners were sourced from the 79th Light Anti-Aircraft Regiment trained at Hadrian's Camp in Carlisle and in November 1941 the men were all issued embarkation leave.

The battery was then formed with other batteries, including the 48th and 69th LAA batteries, into the 21st Light Anti Aircraft Regiment Royal Artillery for service overseas. The battery received quick training in mobile warfare during 'Exercise Bumper' and was issued with a desert kit. Their equipment was painted in desert camouflage ready for overseas deployment in mid-November.

=== "Scuttlebutt" ===
At this stage of the war, the European theatre had expanded into the Middle East and North Africa, and large convoys of reinforcements were being sent to Egypt via the long, maritime route around the South African cape and the Suez Canal. Other reinforcements were also being dispatched to India and Singapore.

The scuttlebutt amongst the 79th gunners was that they were being sent to Iraq to protect the Basra railhead. The new commanding officer of the 21 LAA Regt, Lt-Col Martin Saunders, was called to the War Office in the third week of November and was given instructions on the regiment's destination and operational tasks. It was a secret operation known only to a few. He was the only one among the regiment who knew that they were to be a part of a small advanced force for a landing in French Algeria and then a subsequent 500-mile (800 km) dash to capture the airfields at Tunis and Bizerta.

=== Deployment ===
The battery gunners left Gourock on the Warwick Castle at 08:00 on 7 December 1941. A small team from the 79th accompanied their equipment on the SS Malancha, which sailed independently from Liverpool on the same day as the Japanese launched their attacks on Malaya and Pearl Harbor.

While at sea, the planners at the War Office decided to reschedule the operation which had been one of Winston Churchill's pet projects, but without letting him know. The Operation would eventually take place a year later as “Operation Torch.”

The small convoy, which had been embedded in a much larger troop convoy WS(14) for their voyage to Gibraltar – the staging post for the invasion of Algiers – did not detach on 11 December as planned, but stayed with the main convoy en route to South Africa. The 'Force' received no instructions about what would be their new destination and mission.

In Cape Town, they were to learn that Britain was now at war with Japan and their new assignment was to defend Singapore. Singapore was under attack before they arrived and they were redeployed to Batavia on the jungle-covered island of Java on 3 February 1942. Their ship was attacked as it arrived in port.

In Batavia the 79th LAA Battery was split in half. Troop B was sent to defend the airfield of Malang while Troops A and C boarded the Ban Hong Leong on 9 February to defend Penfui airfield in Dutch Timor – the closest airfield to Australia.

=== Timor ===
After their ship was chased and attacked by two Japanese submarines, the ship was attacked by Japanese bombers as they arrived at Koepang port on 16 February.

In Timor, the battery of 189 personnel joined Sparrow Force – a contingent of 1400 Australian troops, under the command of Australian Lt. Colonel William Leggatt.

To cope with jungle conditions (and the fear that their tall white pith helmets would attract sniper fire), the 79th Battery were issued with the Australian Akubra slouch hat, which they wore with the Royal Artillery cap badge. They are the only non-Australian troops ever to be issued with Australia's traditional hat.

The 79th (British) LAA Battery was the only anti-aircraft artillery on Timor. C Troop defended the Penfui Aerodrome while two detachments of A Troop each defended the coastal guns at Klapalima and Force Headquarters at Force Hill.

The battery certainly proved an important part of Sparrow Force. In Leggatt's log, he praised its actions: "This unit showed its excellent discipline and training during the four days of action. Their guns registered eighteen hits upon enemy aircraft and reported 14 aircraft destroyed, including one four-engined troop carrier, and a twin-engine flying boat. Dive bombing did not deter them in the least; only ammunition shortages prevented them from engaging all enemy aircraft presented." According to Captain Fred East's Intelligence Report, the 79th LAA Bty claimed to have shot down:

- 12 Mitsubishi G4M "Betty" bombers,
- 2 Mitsubishi Ki-57 "Topsy" troop carriers,
- 1 aircraft that resembled a Junkers Ju 88 (possibly a Kawasaki Ki-48),
- 1 aircraft that resembled a Douglas DC-3 (possibly the Showa/Nakajima L2D but most likely the Mitsubishi Ki-57), and
- 1 "naval biplane flying boat which was a persistent dive-bomber" (possibly the Mitsubishi F1M.)

They also claimed to have hit 18 bombers and fighters. "Some bombers had similar turret and fuselage to [the Blenheim bomber ]. All bombers were twin-[engined]."

Japanese Captain Fukada of the Kambe Company Nishiyama "Ace" Battalion stated "that about 20 of their planes had not returned". Natives claimed to have seen 2 crashed Japanese transport planes in the bush with about 28 bodies in each.

The 79th were potent against invading ground forces. The exploding Bofors shells amongst the coconut palms killed numerous advancing infantry. As a result of Sparrow Force's actions, Japan's most successful and elite special force, the 3rd Yokosuka Special Naval Landing Force – which fought in China, the battles for Hong Kong and Ambon – was decimated.

Only one casualty, Gunner Fred Watkins, died in combat. Three were killed on Timor from battle wounds. One member of the battery, Fred Berry, attempted to escape by boat to Australia while another, Harry Martin, was captured and executed while trying to pass critical intelligence to the 2/2nd Independent Company in East Timor.

=== Capture ===
After capitulation on 23 February 1942 the battery was held at Usapa Besar POW camp until 23 September 1942. They were then herded into the hold of an old Chinese freighter, the hellship Dainichi Maru, with the rest of Sparrow Force and transported to Surabaya via Dili coming under attack from Royal Australian Air Force bombers and Royal Navy and Dutch submarines. From there they travelled by train to Batavia and marched 11 miles (18 km) to Makasar where they were separated from the Australians and Dutch to join the R.A.F. POWs in #5 camp. There they rejoined their comrades from B Troop.

On 15 October, the Battery was broken up and sent to different parts of Southeast Asia. Some were held on Java while on 18 October the rest of the battery boarded the notorious Singapore Maru and Oshida Maru freighters to endure a one-week voyage to Singapore.

At Singapore the battery was marched 15 miles (24 km) to Changi Barracks where they would be medically examined and assessed for labour camps throughout Southeast Asia. Some were sent to work on the Siam-Burma 'Death' Railway, sent to build the Sumatra Railway, assigned to work in labour camps all over Japan, or remain in Singapore at the notorious Changi Prison.

Those who travelled to Japan to work in labour camps, endured 46 days on the hellship Dainichi Maru and Tofuku Maru. Most casualties were aboard these hell-ships – from disease shortly after disembarking at Moji.

In Japan, the 79th gunners on the Tofuku Maru travelled by train to Hiraoka where they were held at the Tokyo #2 Detached (Mitsushima) POW Camp. There, they worked to build the Hiraoka Dam. In April 1944, most of the gunners were sent by train to the Tokyo #16 (Showa Denko) POW Camp in Kanose to stoke furnaces in the carbide factory. The gunners who disembarked the Dainichi Maru joined the Fukuoka #1 POW Camp. This group would be later split and relocated to camps in Moji, Kumamoto, Orio, Ube, Omine and Bibai.

Many died from disease or accidents in labour camps on the Siam-Burma 'Death' Railway, in Sumatra, Japan, Java, Borneo, and Changi Prison. Later in the war, several died when their hell-ships were sunk by United States Navy submarine en route to Japan from Singapore.

=== Aftermath ===
After the war ended, Bombardier A.H. 'Jock' Compton fell through the bomb bay doors of a converted B-24 Liberator bomber transporting liberated POWs from Okinawa to Manila.

Six other bombers were brought down by a typhoon on the same day on the same route killing around 120 liberated prisoners of war.

=== War Crimes Trials ===
Several members of the battery were victims of war crimes. In what would be the first war crimes trial after the war, at Yokohama, Tatsuo Tsuchiya was found guilty of mistreatment of several battery members which resulted in deaths at Mitsushima POW Camp at Hiraoka. Several other guards at that camp would also be executed or imprisoned for their roles in the deaths and ill-treatment of battery members. In other Yokohama War Crimes Trials, several battery members testified against Japanese guards for the ill-treatment of fellow battery members at Kanose and Fukuoka Branch camps.

In Darwin, Kempeitai Lieutenant Colonel Yujiro Yutani was tried, found guilty, and executed for killing Gunner Harry Martin.

In Singapore, Otsu Shiro was found guilty of ill-treatment of Allied POWs resulting in the deaths of 27 and physical suffering of many others on the Tofuku Maru. Other Japanese and Korean guards were tried for their roles at POW Camps on Java, Siam-Burma 'Death' Railway, Sumatra, and the Sandakan Death Marches on Borneo.

== Decorations ==
Second Lieutenant A.H. Samuelson was awarded the Military Cross. In his citation, it states:

On 22 February 1942, at 0730 hours 'A' Troop 79 LAA Battery, R.A., under the command of 2/Lieut A.H. SAMUELSON R.A., were attacked by enemy parachutists from an ambush some 800 yards EAST of village of BABOE in TIMOR. The enemy, who opened a heavy fire using Mortars and Automatics, was posted in trees and thick undergrowth. Two platoons AIF counterattacked.
2/Lieut SAMUELSON rallied personnel and displayed considerable coolness directing offensive action while under fire. At one time, the LAA guns were completely encircled and continuously sniped from some 100 yards distance until the two AIF platoons counterattacked. Casualties 1 killed and six wounded.

== Gallery ==
Transport gunners,
79 LAA Bty RA,
Blackpool, 1941.

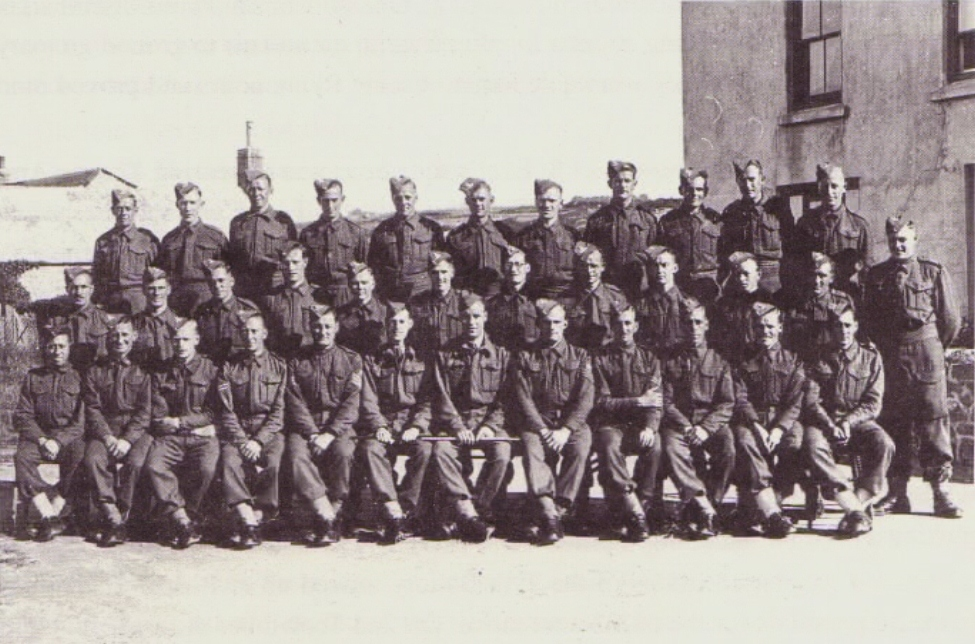
C Troop,
79 LAA Bty RA,
Scilly, 1941.

== See also ==
- Sparrow Force
