= Columbia Country Club Camp =

World War II Japanese internment camp in China

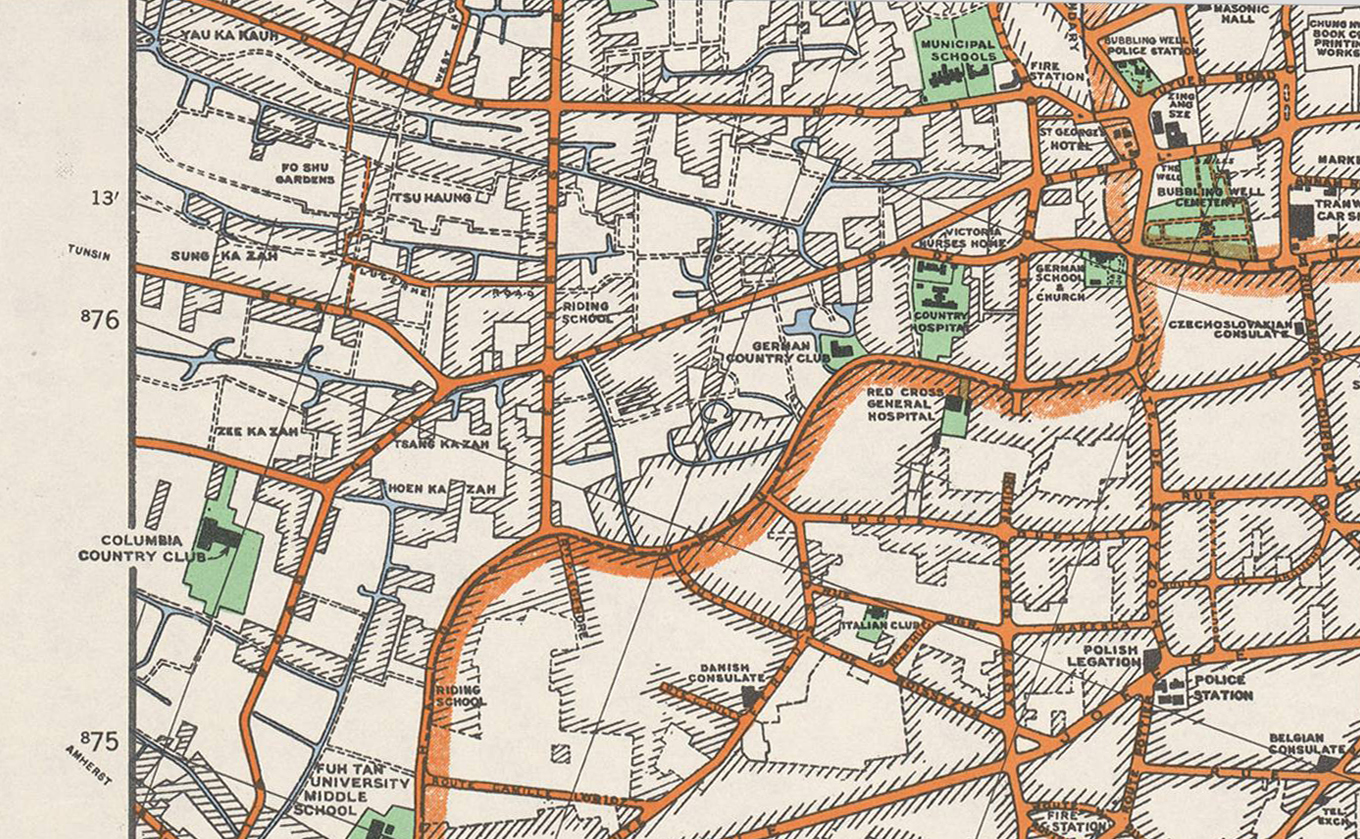
Detail from Plan of Shanghai, drawn 1933, showing the Columbia Country Club on the edge of the city.

Columbia Country Club Camp was a Japanese internment camp for civilian detainees in Shanghai, China, during World War II. It was located in what was then the city outskirts, at 301 Great Western Road (now Yan'an West Road). (For additional camps, see List of Japanese-run internment camps during World War II.)

Currently, the site is now a part of Shanghai Institute of Biological Products, at 1262 Yan'an West Road.

== Pre-War ==
The Columbia Country Club, or CCC, was an American-created social and sports club set on five acres of grounds. It featured tennis courts, an outdoor swimming pool with surrounding arcade, and a squash court. The two-story club house was built in the Spanish Colonial Revival Style, with red tiled roof, a carriage portico at the entrance, and a wide back veranda for dining and dancing.

== Internment ==
During the fall of 1942 and winter of 1943, the Japanese Army used the Club to house enemy nationals, removed from out ports, who awaited repatriation. When influential Shanghailanders gained access to berths on the few available ships, many inmates became stranded there.

In May 1943, the Club became an internment camp for civilians. Space was extremely limited and internees were forced to sleep in the bowling alley, bars, and other club rooms. The swimming pool remained in use initially, but with no chemicals to maintain it, the water was eventually drained. Hundreds stayed at the CCC at any one time; 386 total civilians were interned there. Many were the older couples without family, complicating the death rates at the camp.

In April 1945, and prior to liberation, all remaining internees were removed to the Yangtzepoo POW Camp.
