= Ash Civilian Assembly Center =

Coordinates: 31.220122°N 121.444339°E

Ash Civilian Assembly Center or Ash Camp, was a Japanese internment camp for civilian detainees in Shanghai, China during World War II. Created from a former British Army barracks, it was located at 65 Great Western Road (now Yan'an Xi Lu). The Camp was named for the large amount of ash used to back fill the low-lying areas and prevent flooding. Prior to occupation, the facility housed the Second Battalion of the Argyll and Sutherland Highlanders. (For additional camps, see List of Japanese-run internment camps during World War II.)

== Camp configuration and function ==
The occupying forces opened the camp on March 1, 1943. The eastern half was used by Chinese troops under the Wang Jingwei puppet government while the western half of the camp housed Allied internees. Wooden barrack huts were partitioned into 10 foot by 12 foot rooms for small family groups, while older teens and unmarried inmates lived in six or seven room dormitories. Access was through two gates, both facing Great Western Road. A large stone house with large veranda, previously called the White House, housed the Japanese administration.

== Detainees ==
Ash Camp housed 521 captives within its walls during the war years. Most internees were former Shanghai Municipal Council employees. While a complete roster is not currently available, the following nationalities and/or citizenships are known:

- British 409
- Australian 11
- Palestinian 5
- New Zealanders 3
- American 18 (16 men, 2 women)
- Dutch 1 woman
- Belgian 3 (2 male, 1 female)
- Stateless 5 (1 man, 1 female, 3 children)
