= Funatsu =

Funatsu (written: 舩津, 船津 or ふなつ in hiragana) is a Japanese surname. Notable people with the surname include:

- Kazuki Funatsu (ふなつ 一輝) (born 1973), Japanese manga artist
- Tetsuya Funatsu (舩津 徹也) (born 1987), Japanese footballer
- Yuya Funatsu (船津 佑也) (born 1983), Japanese footballer

== See also ==
- Funatsu Station (disambiguation), multiple train stations in Japan
