= Garuda Indonesia Flight 421 =

2002 aviation accident in Indonesia

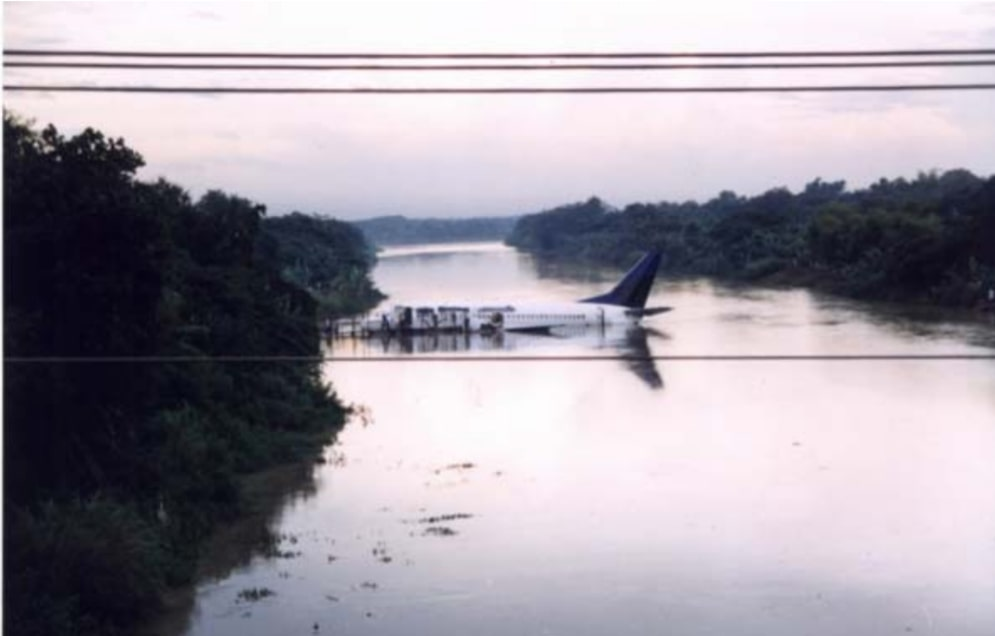
- The aircraft after ditching into the Bengawan Solo River

Accident
- Date: 16 January 2002
- Summary: Dual engine flameout due to heavy rain/hail resulting in ditching
- Site: Bengawan Solo River (near Solo, Central Java, Indonesia); 7°40′03″S 110°46′48″E

Aircraft
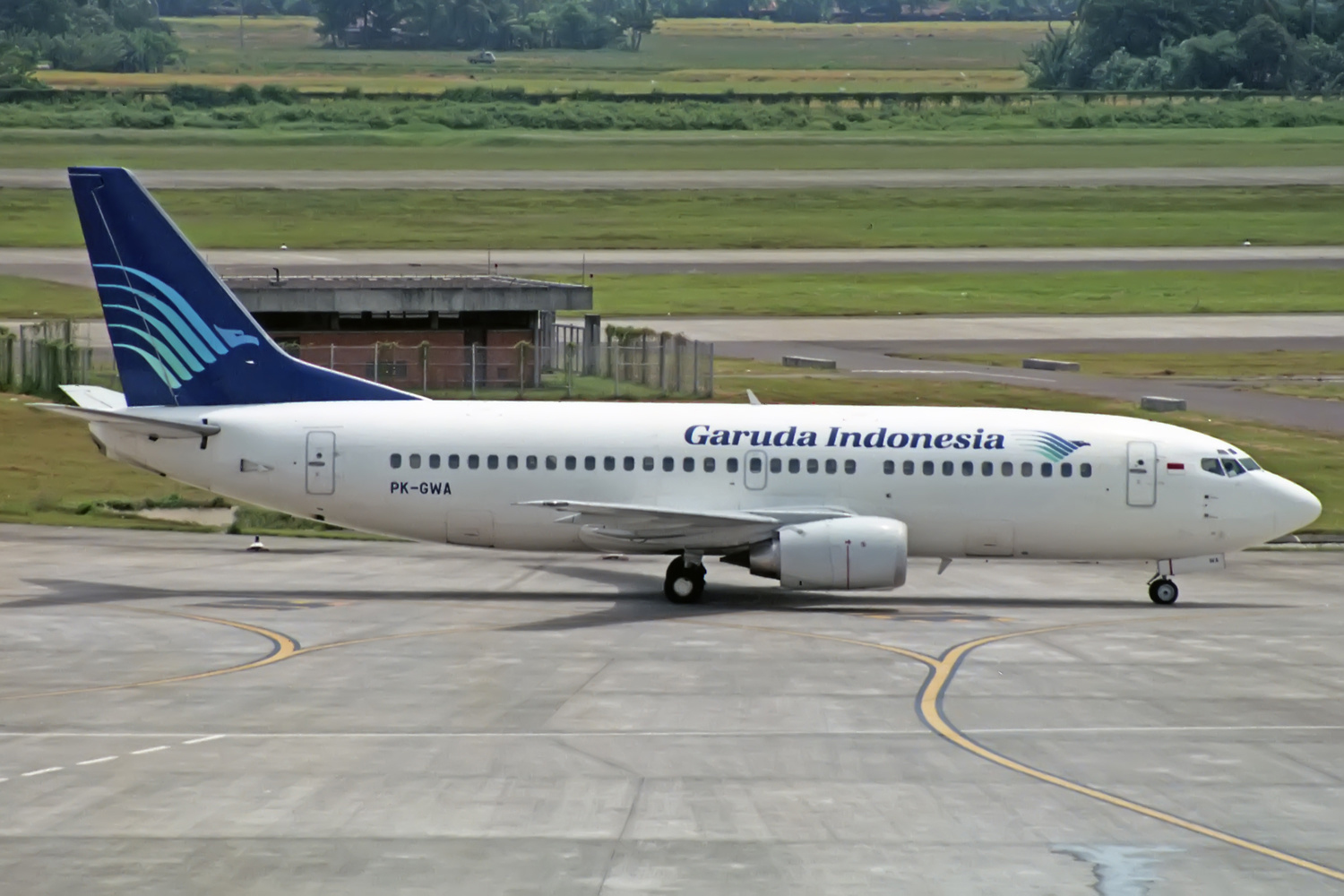
- PK-GWA, the aircraft involved in the accident, seen in 1992
- Aircraft type: Boeing 737-3Q8
- Operator: Garuda Indonesia
- IATA flight No.: GA421
- ICAO flight No.: GIA421
- Call sign: INDONESIA 421
- Registration: PK-GWA
- Flight origin: Selaparang Airport, Ampenan
- Destination: Adisucipto International Airport, Yogyakarta
- Occupants: 60
- Passengers: 54
- Crew: 6
- Fatalities: 1
- Injuries: 13
- Survivors: 59

Garuda Indonesia Flight 421 was a scheduled domestic flight operated by Indonesian flag carrier Garuda Indonesia travelling about 625 km (388 mi; 337 nmi) from Ampenan to Yogyakarta utilizing a Boeing 737-300. On 16 January 2002, the flight encountered severe thunderstorm activity during approach to its destination, suffered flameout in both engines, and ditched in a shallow river, resulting in one fatality and several injuries.

== Accident ==
As the Boeing 737-300 aircraft was on approach to its destination, the pilots were confronted with substantial thunderstorm activity visible ahead and on their onboard weather radar. They attempted to fly between two intense weather cells visible on their radar. They later entered a thunderstorm containing heavy rain and hail. About 90 seconds later, as the aircraft was descending through 19,000 ft (5,800 m), both CFM International CFM56 engines experienced a flameout, which resulted in the loss of all generated electrical power. Both engines were set at their flight-idle power setting before flameout occurred. The crew tried unsuccessfully to restart the engines two or three times. They then tried but failed to start the auxiliary power unit (APU), at which time total electrical power loss occurred. (During the later investigation, the NiCd battery was found to have been in poor condition due to inadequate maintenance procedures.) First Officer Gunawan attempted to transmit a Mayday call, but was unable to. As the aircraft descended through the lower layer of clouds at approximately 8,000 ft (2,400 m), the pilots saw the Bengawan Solo River and decided to attempt to ditch in the river with the flaps and gear retracted. The ditch procedure was successful, leaving the aircraft settled down on its belly in the shallow water, with the fuselage, wings and control surfaces largely intact. There was no fire.

== Aircraft and crew ==
The aircraft was a Boeing 737-3Q8 manufactured in 1989, and allocated aircraft registration PK-GWA. On this flight, it was flown by Captain Abdul Rozaq (44), and First Officer Harry Gunawan (46). Rozaq had logged 14,020 flight hours, including 5,086 hours on the Boeing 737, and Gunawan had 7,137 flight hours.

=== Passengers ===
Nationality	Passengers			Crew			Total		
Nationality	Total	Killed	Survived	Total	Killed	Survived	Total	Killed	Survived
Australia	1	0	1	0	0	0	1	0	1
Indonesia	48	0	48	6	1	5	54	1	53
Italy	2	0	2	0	0	0	2	0	2
Netherlands	1	0	1	0	0	0	1	0	1
Norway	1	0	1	0	0	0	1	0	1
Thailand	1	0	1	0	0	0	1	0	1
Total	54	0	54	6	1	5	60	1	59

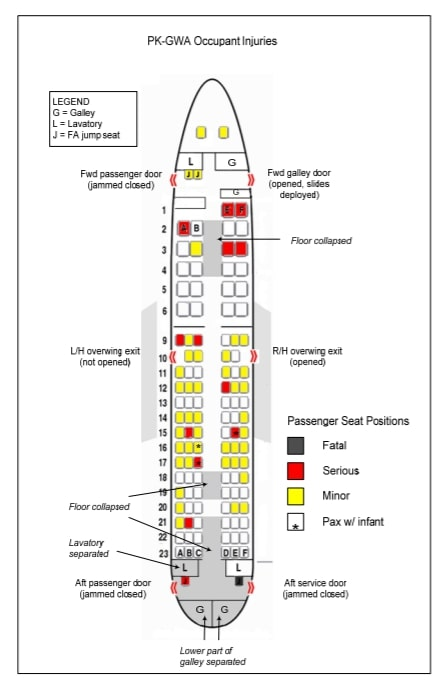
The seating chart of Flight 421

== Evacuation and rescue ==
Only two doors were available for evacuation. Residents of nearby villages assisted. Uninjured passengers and their personal belongings were temporarily sheltered in a nearby empty house, while injured passengers were transported by an available vehicle to the nearest clinic. After evacuation, the pilot contacted the Garuda Operations Centre in Jakarta via cellphone and reported the emergency landing and location. The rescue team arrived two hours later and all remaining passengers and crew were taken safely to a hospital.

== Aircraft damage and injuries ==
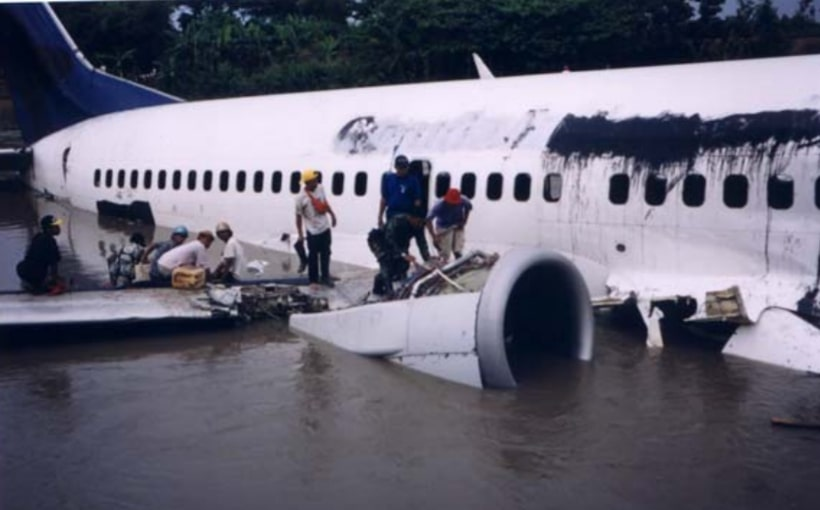
Closer up view of the hull

There was severe damage to the submerged aircraft belly, especially near the tail, leading to the inference that it landed nose high with tail impacting the shallow river bed, which ripped away the cabin floor together with the two flight attendants seated there. Both were found with severe injuries in the river behind the aircraft. One of the attendants, 25-year old Santi Anggraeni, did not survive. Twelve passengers suffered injuries, while the flight crew and other two flight attendants were injured. The aircraft was written off as a total loss, making the accident the 11th hull loss and eighth fatal accident involving the Boeing 737-300.

== NTSC investigation and report ==
The final report of the Indonesian National Transportation Safety Committee (NTSC) noted that pilot training in the interpretation of weather radar images was not formal, being given only during flight training. It was considered possible that the precipitation was so dense that it attenuated the radar signals, reducing the reflections that usually indicate precipitation and making such high density appear to be a clearer path. Had the crew manipulated the radar tilt to sweep the ground during descent, they would have been aware of the risks associated with the chosen flight path. Intense noise audible in data from the cockpit voice recorder as well as damage to the nose radome and engines indicated the presence of hail with the rain. The report concluded that the hail/water density exceeded the engine tolerance at flight idle, resulting in flameout.

== Remarks by U.S. NTSB ==
A later Safety Recommendation letter from the U.S. NTSB to the FAA notes that analyses of flight recorder data and weather satellite images indicate that the aircraft had already entered a thunderstorm cell at the start of the diversion to avoid the storm. It also notes that the procedure recommended in the Boeing 737 Operations Manual to respond to a dual flameout is to first start the APU (which could then provide much more power to start the main engines). Furthermore, repeating a comment in the NTSC report, the letter notes Boeing's advice that, in moderate to severe rain, starting main engines can take up to three minutes to spool up to idle, whereas the pilots allowed only one minute before initiating another retry. However, the battery on the stricken aircraft was found to have been faulty, holding only 22 volts before the flameout occurred when a fully charged battery should have 24 volts. The fact that the battery was faulty before the flameout meant the pilots’ futile attempts to restart the engines all but drained the remaining power from an already damaged battery, resulting in there being no power to start the auxiliary power unit, which explains the total loss of electrical power, even after the plane left the storm. There was simply no power to restart the engines (B737 uses bleed air starters, requiring APU, ground air, or engine cross-border to start) or start the APU. The letter from the NTSB also recommends to the FAA that pilots be advised to maintain a higher engine power level in moderate to severe precipitation to avoid flameout.

== Aftermath ==
Garuda Indonesia also funded local road construction near the accident area and also built a multipurpose hall and reservoir facility in appreciation of local villagers' assistance in evacuating the passengers and crew.

On September 28, 2018, sixteen years after the Flight 421 ditching incident, Captain Abdul Rozaq once again survived another horrific accident, when he survived the 2018 Tsunami and Earthquake that occurred in the city of Palu, Central Sulawesi. At that time of the accident, Captain Abdul Rozaq was flying from Makassar to Palu and had to stay overnight at the City of Palu. The hotel where the Garuda Indonesia crew stayed was located directly in front of the city beach where the tsunami occurred. However, Captain Rozaq, along with the rest of his flight crew who also had to stay overnight in the city, managed to evacuate from the hotel, which was hit very badly by the tsunami. Due to the COVID-19 pandemic, Rozaq was reported to have retired in 2020 as the result of the downfall of travel demand during the pandemic.

== Dramatization ==
The crash was dramatized in the 16th season of the TV series Mayday – also re-packaged as Air Disasters – in an episode entitled "River Runway".

It is featured in season 1, episode 1, of the TV show Why Planes Crash.

== See also ==
- TACA Flight 110 – Similar incident with same aircraft type, dual engine flameout when passing through thunderstorm
- US Airways Flight 1549 – Similar incident, dual engine flameout due to birdstrike leading to ditching
- Southern Airways Flight 242 – Similar incident involving a DC-9, dual engine flameout due to rain/ hail ingestion
- Water landing
- Emergency landing
- CFM56 engine design flaw – Engine flaw involving flameout after intake of heavy amounts of rain/ hail
