= Solo River =

Longest river in Java

Bengawan Solo ꦧꦼꦔꦮꦤ꧀ꦱꦭ
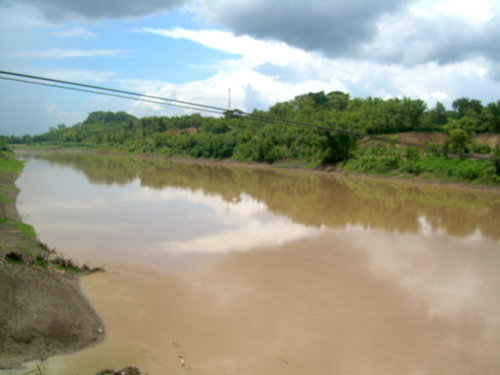
- The Bengawan Solo passing through Bojonegoro

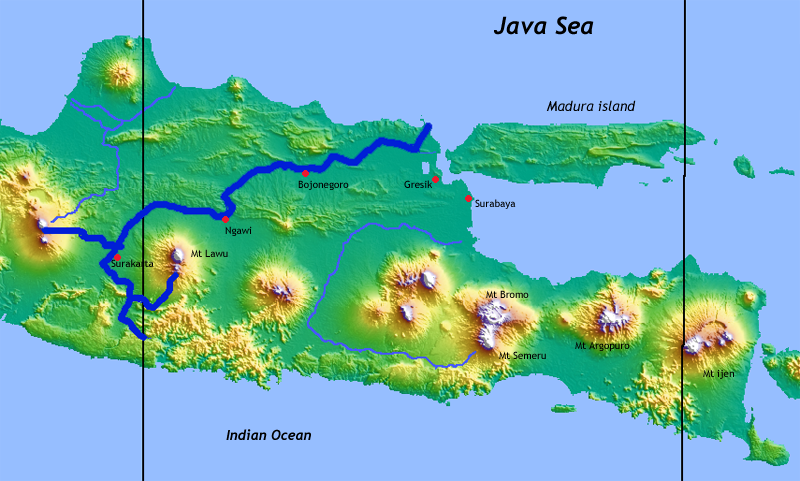

Location
- Country: Indonesia
- Provinces: Central Java, East Java
- Cities/Towns: Surakarta, Ngawi, Bojonegoro

Physical characteristics
- Source: Southern Mountains of East Java (Sewu Mountains)
  - location: Special Region of Yogyakarta, Central Java, Ngawi and East Java
- 2nd source: Mount Merapi and Mount Merbabu
  - location: Boyolali Regency
- 3rd source: Mount Lawu
  - location: Karanganyar Regency
- 4th source: Western region of Mount Wilis
  - location: Sooko, Ponorogo Regency
- Mouth: Java Sea
  - location: Gresik Regency & Sedayulawas (Lamongan Regency)
  - coordinates: 6.877111°S 112.556167°E
- Length: 600 km (370 mi)
- Basin size: 16,100 km^{2} (6,200 sq mi)
- Discharge
  - average: 684 m3/s (24,155 cu ft/s)

Basin features
- River system: Bengawan Solo basin (DAS230217)
- Landmarks: Fort van den Bosch; Solo Safari Zoo; Kusuma Bhakti Heroes' Memorial Park; University of Surakarta
- Waterbodies: Gajah Mungkur Dam
- Bridges: Sembayat Bridge; Karanggeneng Bridge; Laren Bridge; Tuban-Babat National Road Bridge; Oude Indië Spoorbrug bij Kléwér; Kanor - Rengel Bridge; Kaliketek Bridge; Lengkung Bojonegoro Bridge; Padangan Bridge; Solo-Cepu railroad Bridge;
- Basin management & authority: BPDAS Solo; BBWS Bengawan Solo

The Solo River (known in Indonesian as the Bengawan Solo, with Bengawan being an Old Javanese word for river, and Solo derived from the old name for Surakarta) is the longest river in the Indonesian island of Java. It is approximately 600 km (370 mi) in length.

Apart from its importance as a watercourse to the inhabitants and farmlands of the eastern and northern parts of the island, it is a renowned region in paleoanthropology circles. Many discoveries of early hominid remains (dating from 100,00 to 1.5 million years ago) have been made at several sites in its valleys, especially at Sangiran, including that of the first early human fossil found outside of Europe, the so-called "Java Man" skull, discovered in 1891.

The Bengawan Solo was the crash site of Garuda Indonesia Flight 421 on January 16, 2002.

== History ==
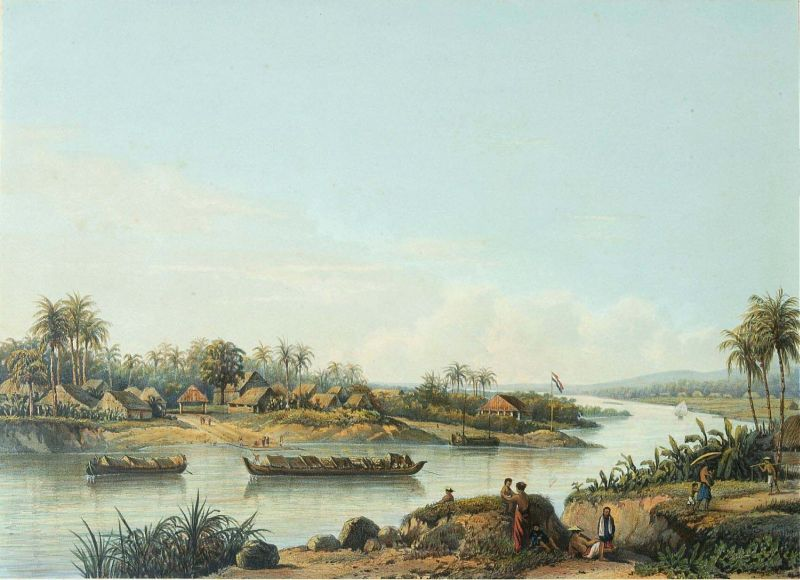
Vessels on the Solo River during the colonial period

Solo River was part of a massive river system that once existed in Sundaland. This drainage of the river system consisted of a major river in present-day Sumatra and Borneo, such as the Asahan River, Musi River and Kapuas River. The river system disappeared when Sundaland was submerged after sea level rise following the last Ice Age.

The river played an important part in Javanese history. Its drainage basin is an important agricultural area, dominated by rice farming. The river transported fertile volcanic soil downstream, replenishing the soil. It also provided a link between Javanese port cities on the northern coast and the rice-growing hinterlands, with shallow vessels transporting rice to the ports to be sold. This rice is Java's main commodity that was traded as part of the Spice trade.

Following the acquisition of much of Java by the Dutch colonial government, various cash crops were introduced to be planted across the river basin, such as coffee, sugar, and cotton. (see Cultivation System).

By the last years of the 19th century, river sedimentation in its original delta in Madura Strait started to disrupt vessel traffic in the port of Surabaya. The Dutch colonial government decided to divert the river flow away from the shipping lane into the Java Sea. They built a canal in the river's delta in the 1890s which still alters the river to this day.

In 1891, Dutch paleoanthropologist Eugène Dubois discovered remains (a part of a skull and human-like femur bone and tooth) he described as "a species in between humans and apes". He called his finds Pithecanthropus erectus ("ape-human that stands upright") or Java Man. Today, they are classified as Homo erectus ("human that stands upright"). These were the first specimens of early hominid remains to be found outside of Africa or Europe.

== Course ==
It passes through the major city of Surakarta (called Solo by the local inhabitants). An important early tributary to the Solo River is the Dengkeng River, which has its source on Mount Merapi. After passing through Solo, the river flows northward around Mount LawuRegency and then turns eastward into East Java in the Ngawi Regency and Ngawi (town).

After Ngawi the river turns northward again, forming the boundary between Blora Regency of Central Java and Bojonegoro regency of East Java. From the town of Cepu in Blora, the river turns eastward and passes through Bojonegoro Regency's capital city. From there, it continues eastward through the Lamongan and Gresik Regencies. The last part of the river's basin (roughly starting from Bojonegoro regency) is mostly flat land.

Bengawan Solo's delta is located near the town of Sidayu in the Gresik Regency. The present delta is redirected by a human-made canal. The original delta flowed into the Madura Strait, but in 1890 a 12-km canal was made by the Dutch East Indies authority to redirect the Solo River into the Java Sea. This was done to prevent sedimentation of mud from filling the Madura Strait and thereby preventing sea access to the important port city of Surabaya.

The Solo River Delta has a huge mud sedimentation flow that deposits 17 million tonnes of mud per year. This sedimentation in the delta forms a cape, which has an average longitudinal growth of 70 m per year. This delta is known as Ujung Pangkah (Pangkah Cape).

== Resource management ==
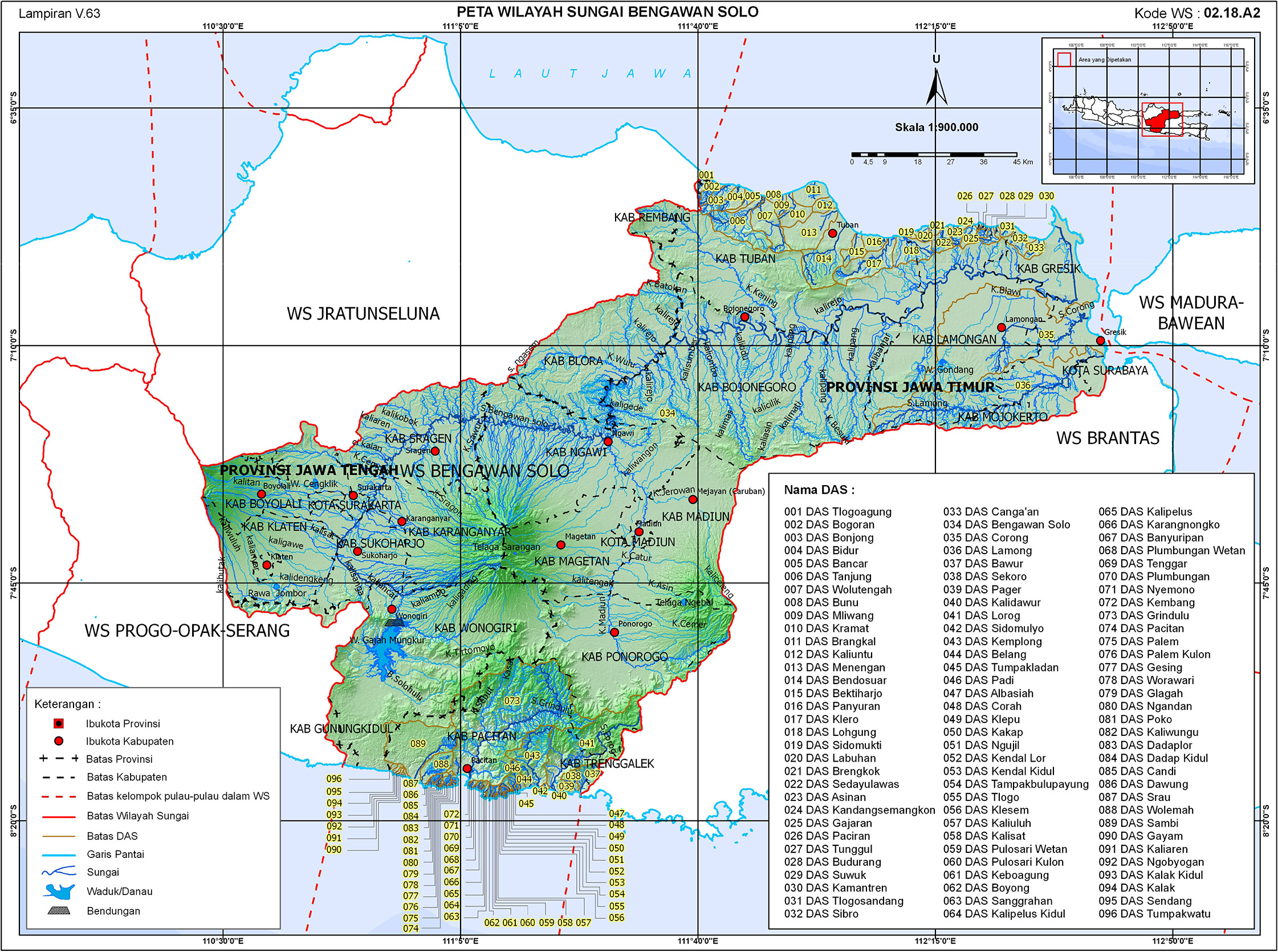
The map depicts the Bengawan Solo River Region, which consists of 96 river basins, including the Bengawan Solo basin (number 034).

Brantas River Public Corporation or Perum Jasa Tirta I (PJT1) is responsible for managing the water resources of the Brantas and Bengawan Solo river basins in Indonesia. It is a centralised effort to:

- conserve the water resource quality and quantity in the Bengawan Solo and Brantas River basins
- flood control
- manage hydroelectric and other infrastructure along those rivers.

Before the centralised management efforts, there were reports of pollution along the Bengawan Solo.

== River modifications ==
The river has several dams and modifications.

The Gondang Dam, East Java, is located on the Kali Gondang River, a sub-basin of the Bengawan Solo River, at the village of Gondang Lor, in Sugio, a sub-district of Lamongan, Indonesia. It was built in 1983–1987 and has a 6.6-hectare (16-acre) surface area and is about 29 meters in depth. The main use of the dam is for irrigation and community water needs, especially in the dry season, but many tourists come there for relaxing and fishing now. There is a campsite, pedalos and a small zoo. The manager of the dam is committed to implementing the programs of Sapta Pesona (Seven Charms).

Construction of another dam, known as the Gondang Dam, began near Karanganyar, Central Java, in 2014 with a budget of Rp 636 billion to increase the local water supply and add recreational opportunities. The site size was estimated to be 88.25 hectares and was planned to hold a total volume of 10 million cubic meters. The dam was completed in 2019 but not expected to be fully filled until 2020, and durian trees were grown near the site to attract tourists. In 2023, the dam's community team held a durian festival at the site.

== In culture ==
"Bengawan Solo", a song composed by Gesang Martohartono in 1940, poetically describes the river and has become famous across Asia.

== See also ==
- List of drainage basins of Indonesia
