= Fort van den Bosch =

Fort in Ngawi, Indonesia

Coordinates: 7.3901°S 111.4546°E

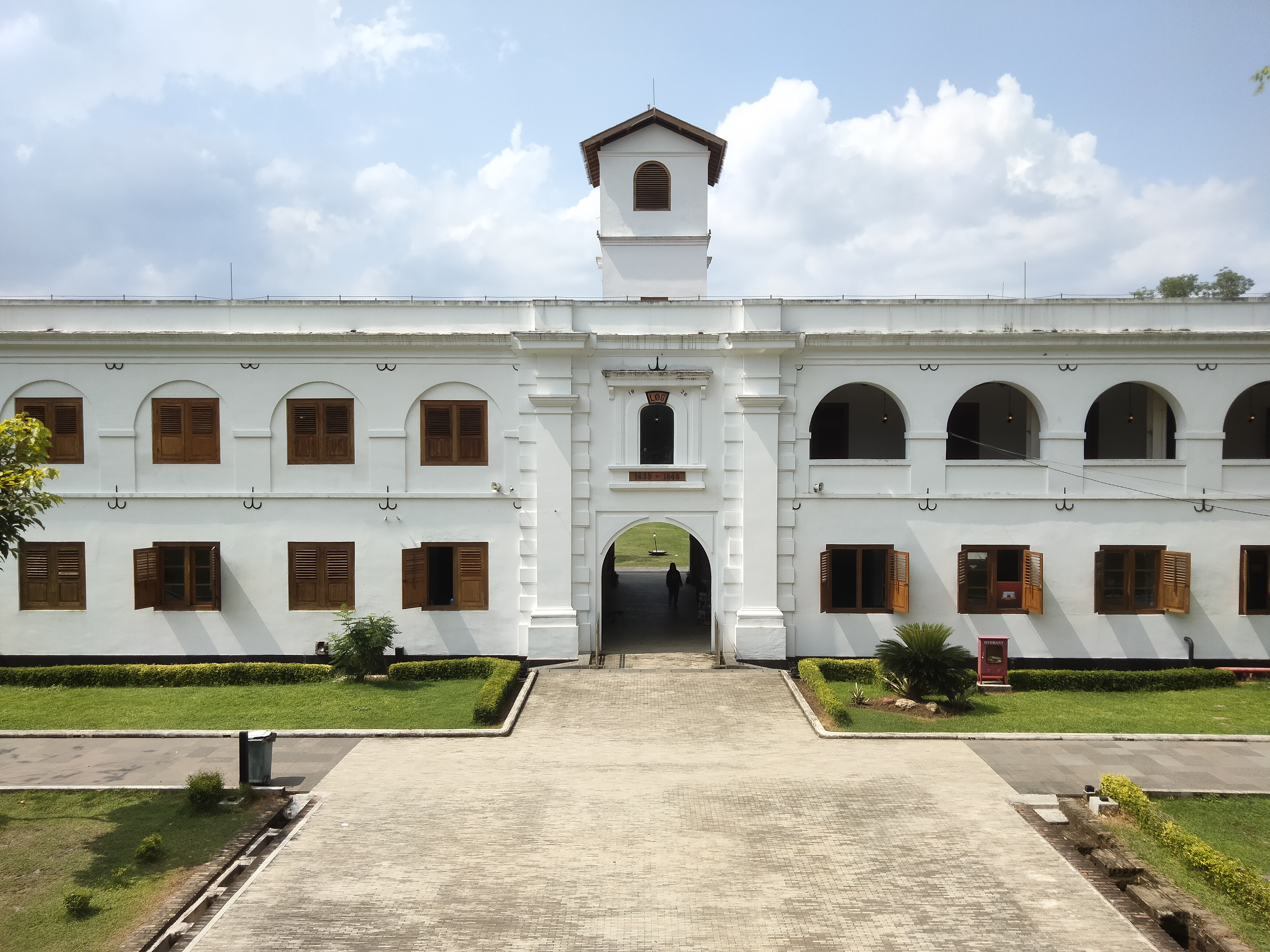
Upper front fort

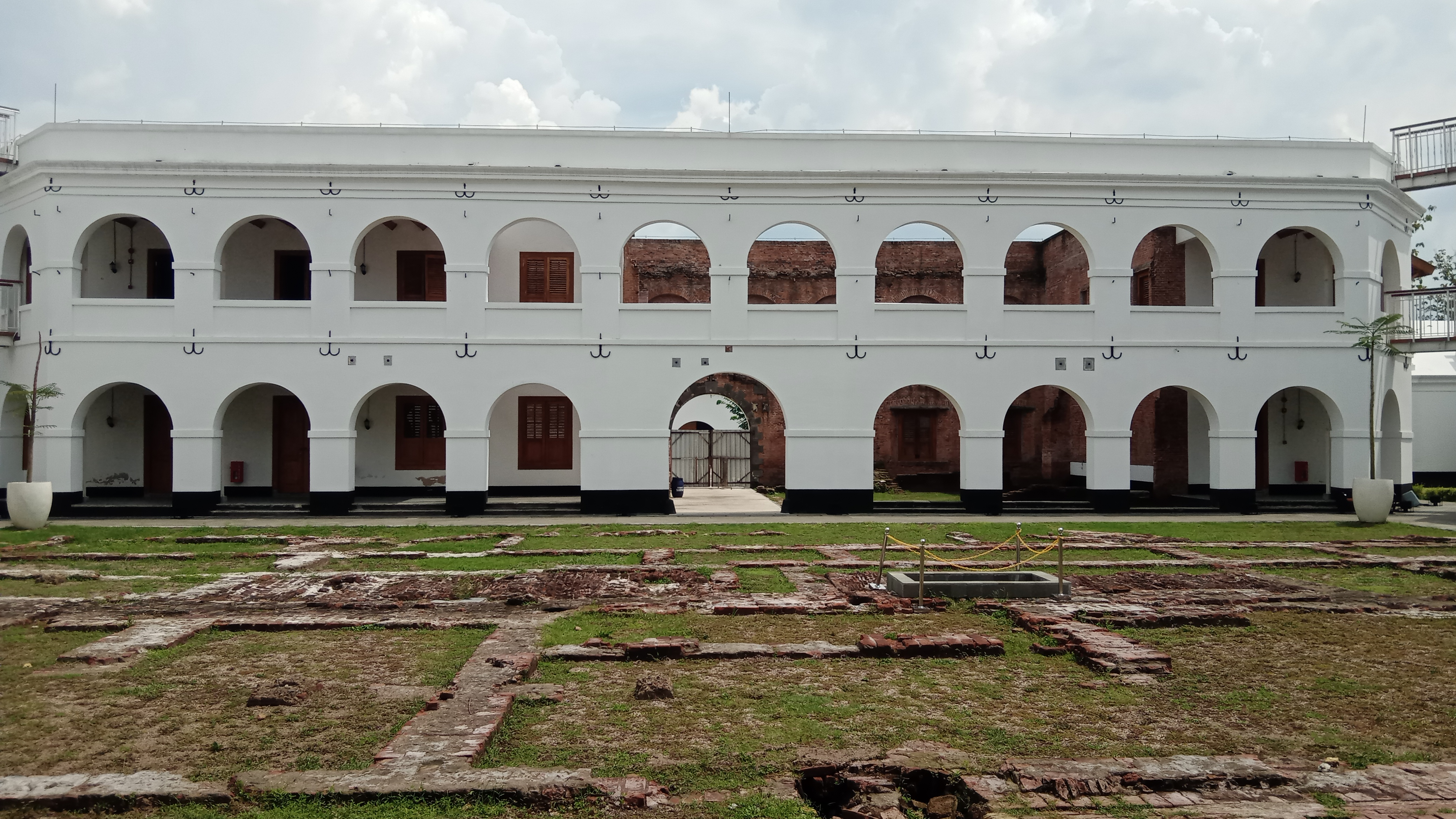
A building in Fort van den Bosch after restoration

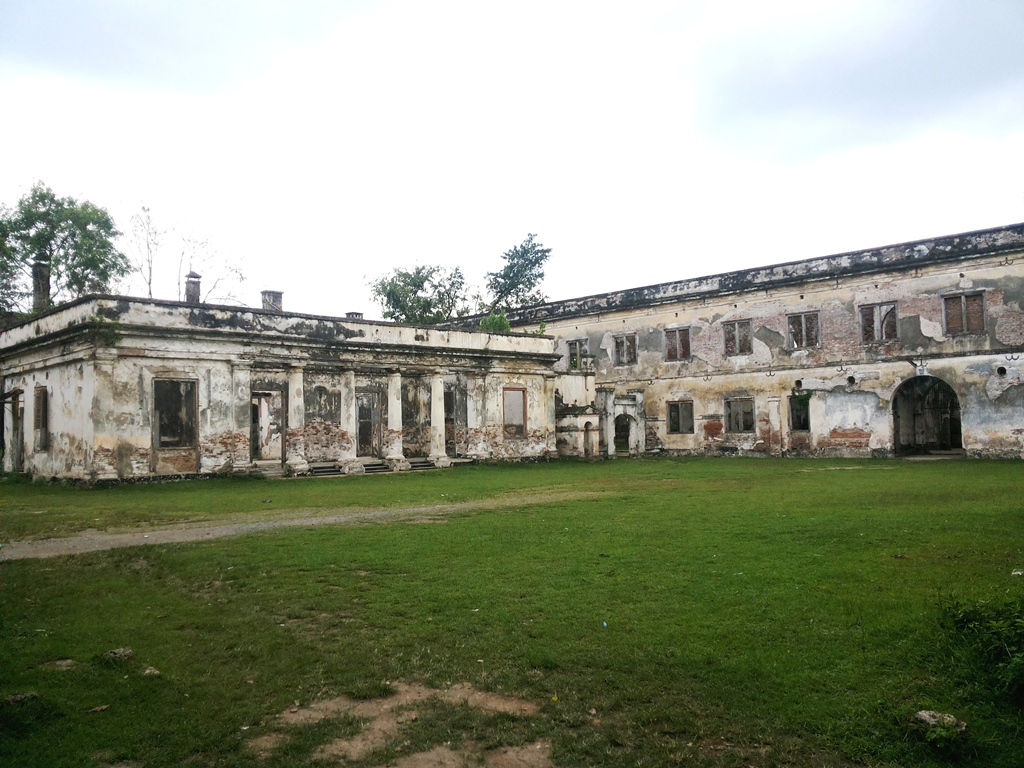
The fort before restoration

Fort van den Bosch, locally known as Benteng Pendem ("sunken fort"), is a fort located in Pelem administrative village, Ngawi (city), Ngawi, Indonesia.

== History ==
In the 19th century, Ngawi was known as the center of trade and shipping in East Java. The Dutch established a defense center in the region of Madiun especially to cope with the Java War which was led by Prince Diponegoro. The fight against the Dutch in each region was started by each of the region's local ruler: the region of Madiun was led by Regent Kerto Dirjo, and in Ngawi it was led by Adipati Judodiningrat, Raden Tumenggung Surodirjo, and Wirotani (a follower of Diponegoro).

In 1825, the Dutch managed to capture Ngawi. To maintain their position in Ngawi, as well as to oversee the trade route along the area, the Dutch East Indies government ordered the construction of a new fort. A location was chosen at the confluence of Bengawan Solo and Madiun River. The fort was finished in 1845 and was named Fort van den Bosch. It was equipped with rooms for 250 soldiers, 6 cannons, and 60 cavalries led by Johannes van den Bosch.

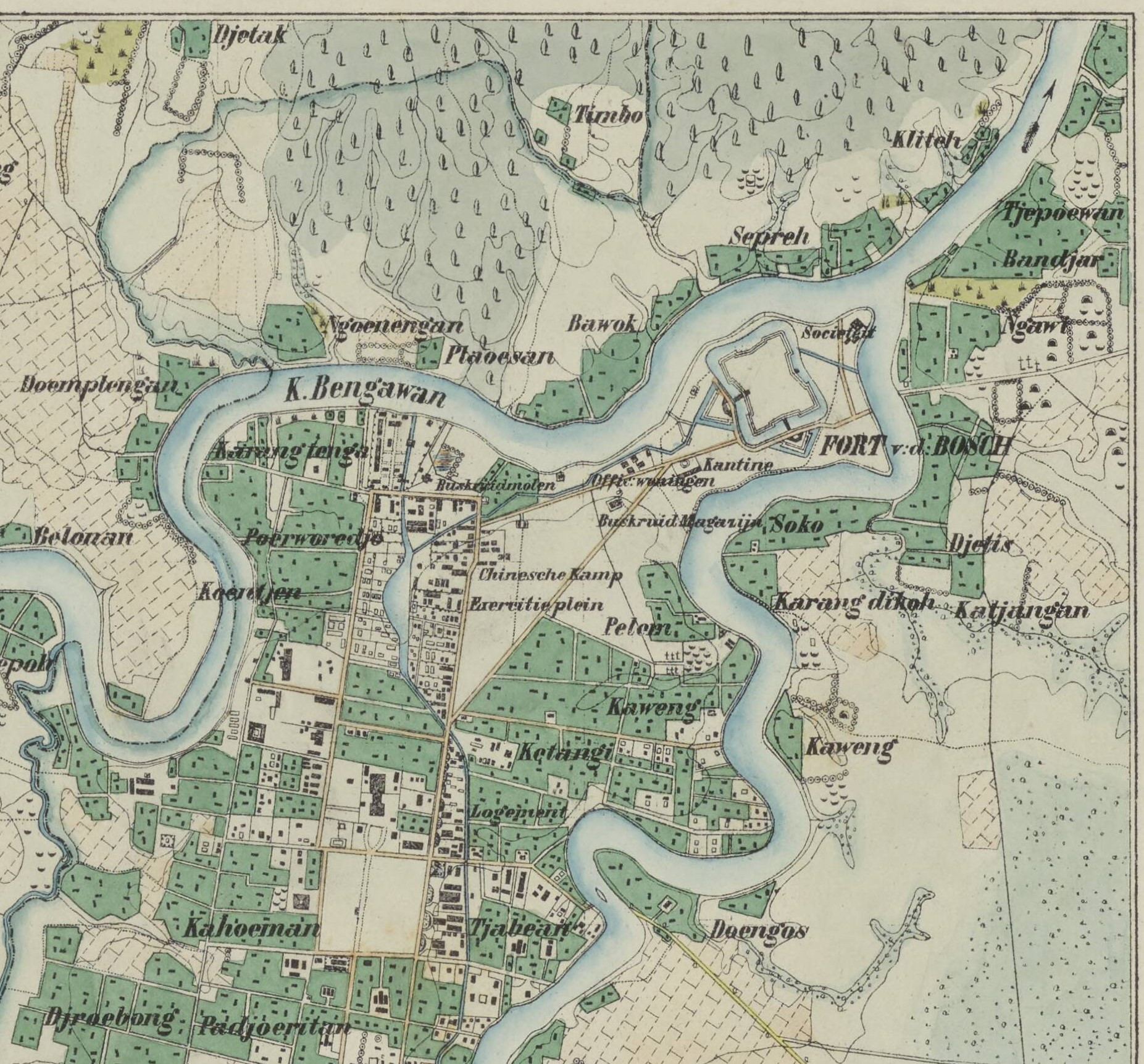
Topographical map with the confluence of the Solo River/Bengawan Solo and Madiun River.

During the Japanese occupation period, the fort was converted into a civilian camp for men and boys. From February 1943 to February 12, 1944; about 1,580 men, including Brits and Americans, were imprisoned in Fort Van den Bosch. Nakamura was listed as the prison commendant, while natives were employed to be prison guards. Some of the internees were held in the fort prison, and some in barracks on the front part of the ground. On February 12, 1944, the internees were transferred to the 4th and 9th Battalions' Encampment in Tjimahi.

From 21 January 1945 to August 30, 1945, Fort van den Bosch was reused as a civilian camp. About 737 internees were imprisoned in the fort. This time, the internees were Indo-European men and boys who refused to swear loyalty to the Japanese authorities. The internees lived under a hard regime. When the Japanese left Indonesia, the internees were freed, taken with a truck to Ngawi station, and from there by train to places e.g. Yogyakarta.

After sovereignty handover the fort was briefly used by Indonesian Army before fell into deterioration until its current dilapidated condition. In February 2019, President Joko Widodo announced that the fort complex will be repaired and revitalized into near original condition for tourist destination.

== The fort ==
The fort is located in Kelurahan Pelem, Ngawi Subdistrict, Ngawi Regency. It is a 165-meter x 80 meter sized built within a 15 ha area. The fort is situated at the confluence of the Bengawan Solo and Madiun River. The fort was built lower than the surrounding terrain, hence the local nickname Benteng Pendem or "sunken fort". The multi-floored fort contains hundred of rooms for military use.

Inside the fort is the tomb of Kyai Haji Muhammad Nursalim, one of the followers of Diponegoro who was captured by the Dutch. Local legend mentioned Muhammad Nursalim as the first person who spread Islam in Ngawi. He is said to has a powerful magic power of immune to gunshot, so the Dutch decided to bury him alive.

== Gallery ==
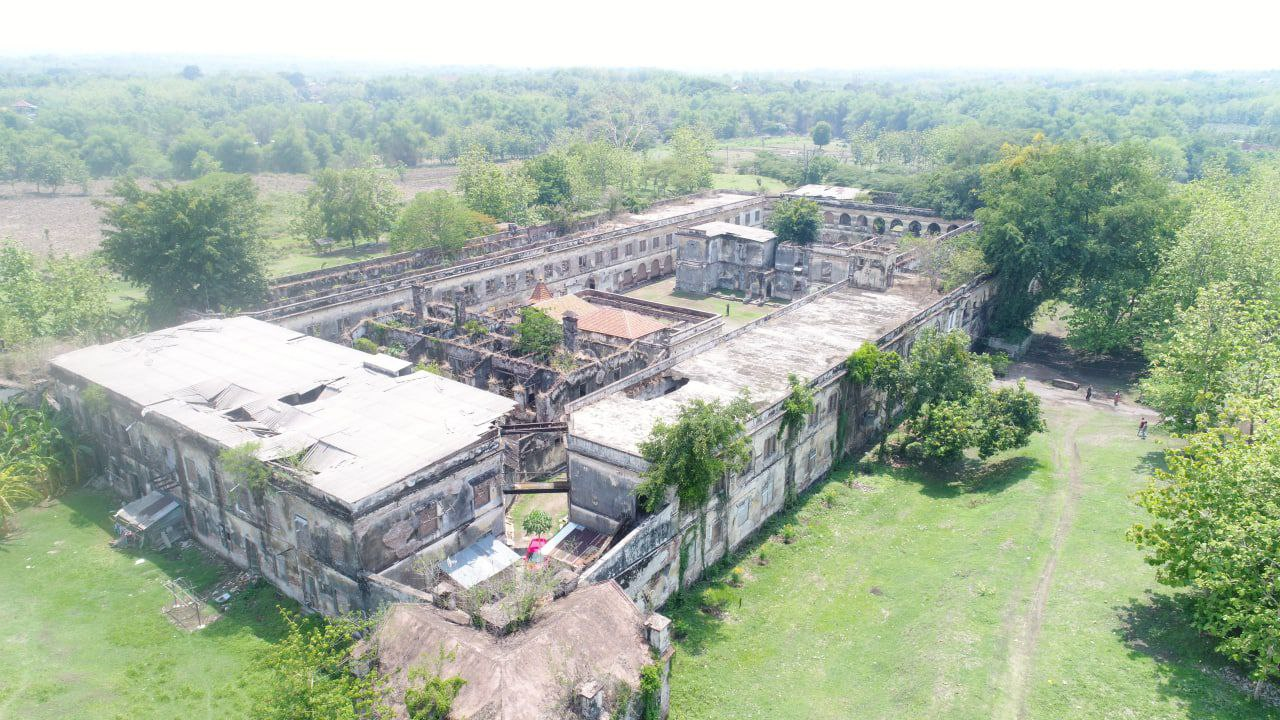
Aerial view of Fort van den Bosch

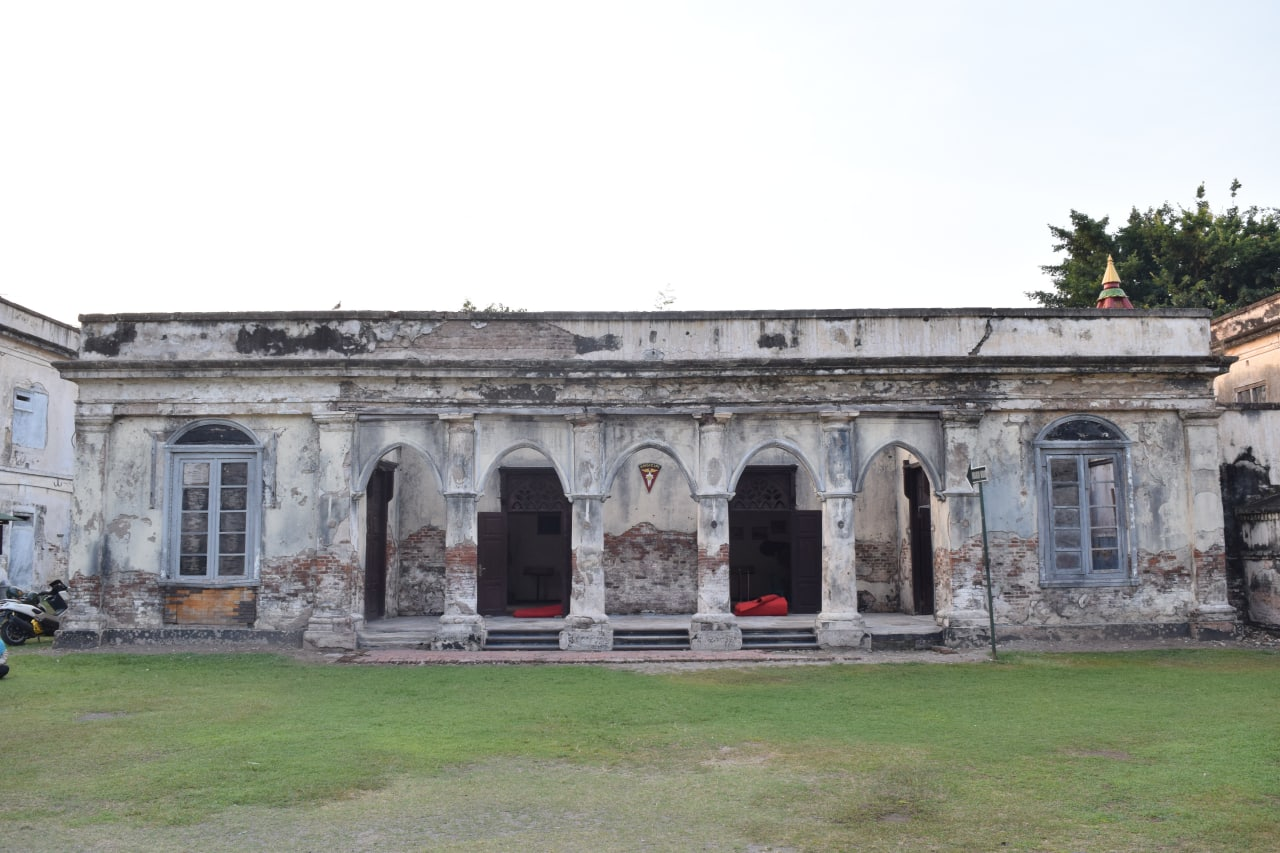
Fort van den Bosch Museum

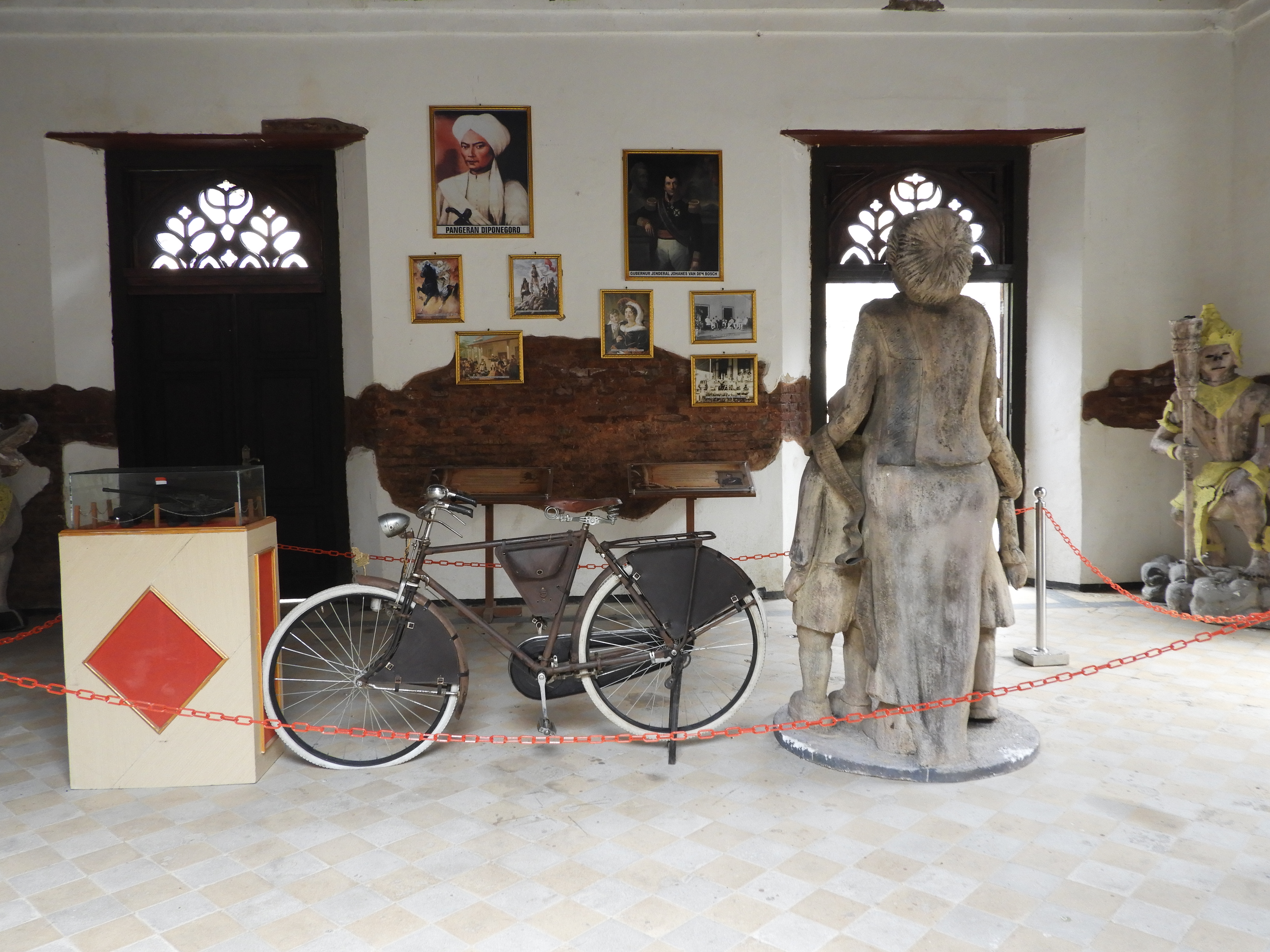
Collection of Fort Van den Bosch Museum

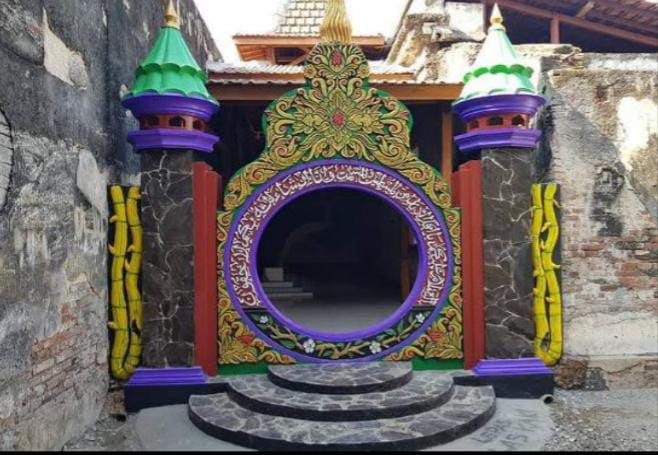
Tomb of K.H. M. Nursalim inside the fort

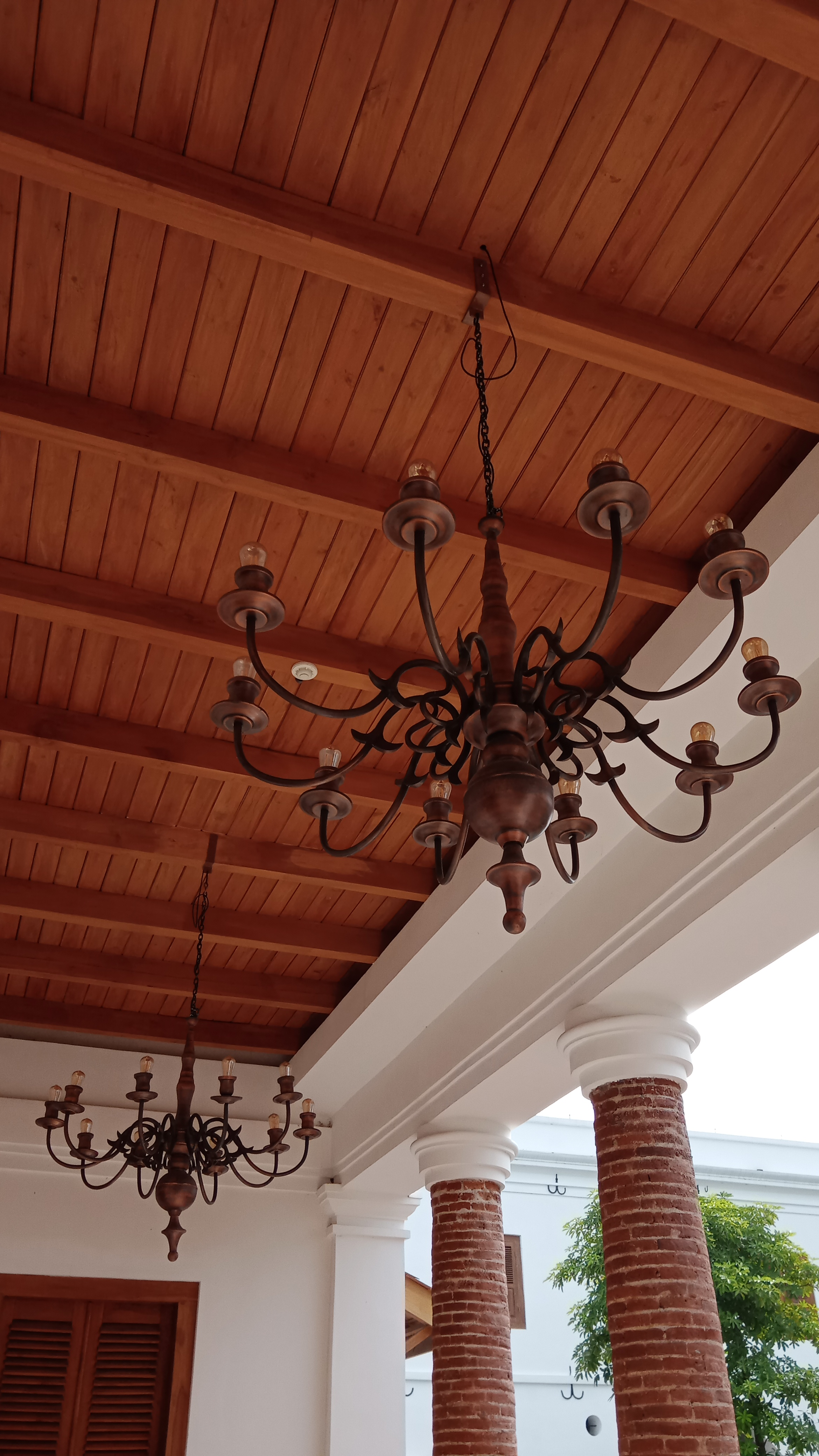
Chandeliers outside the museum building

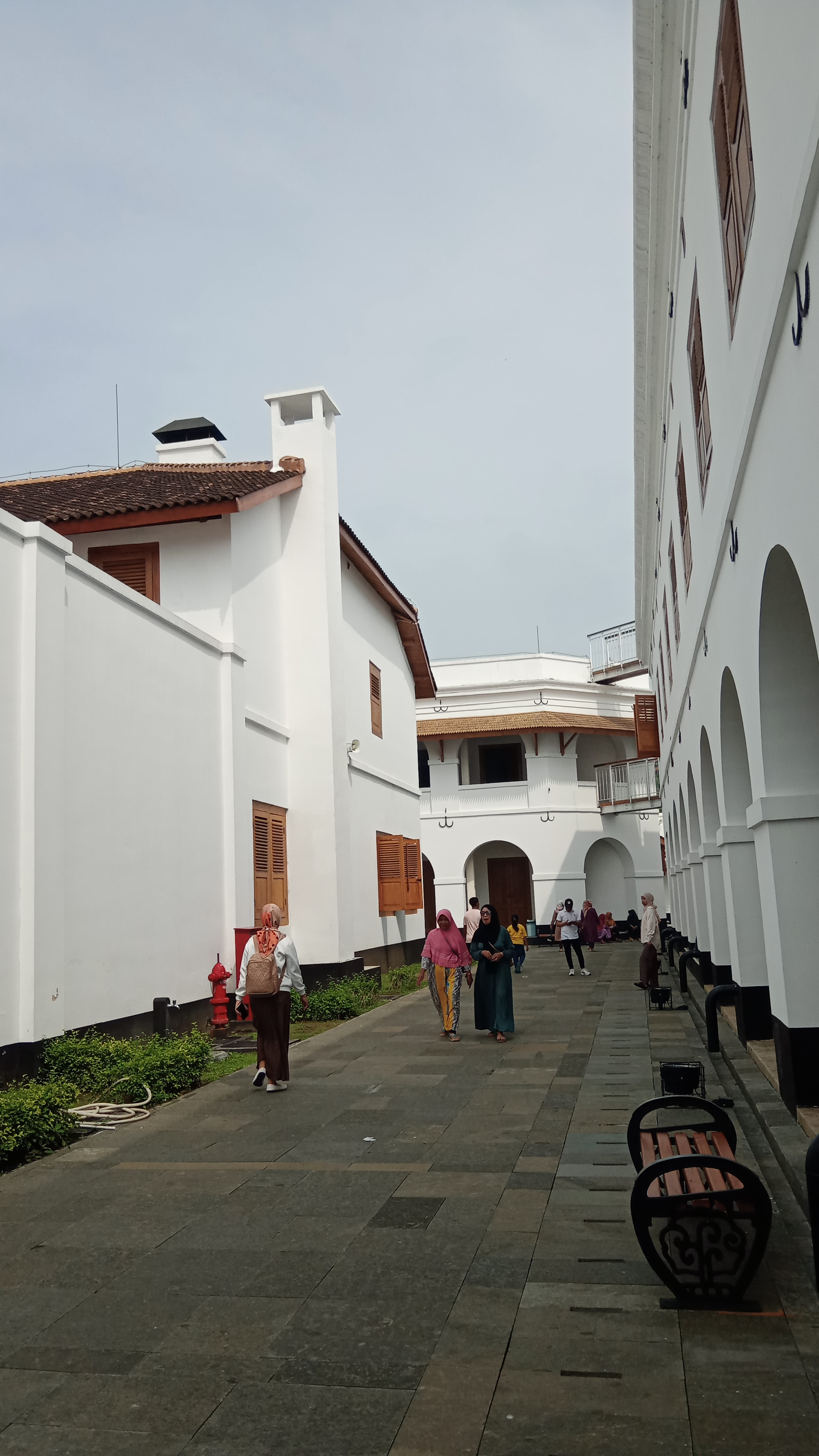
Visitors in the fort

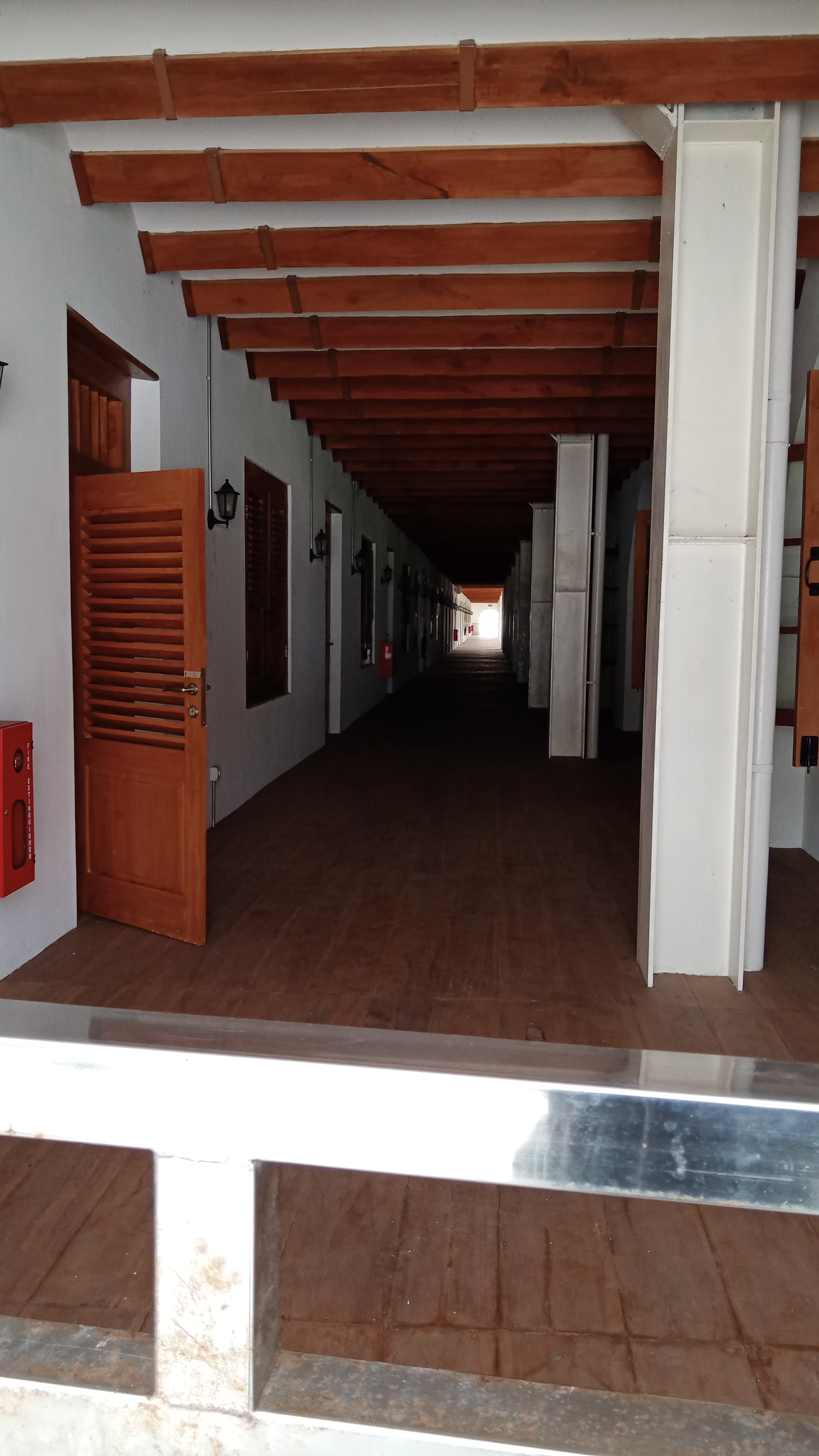
A second-story interior of the fort

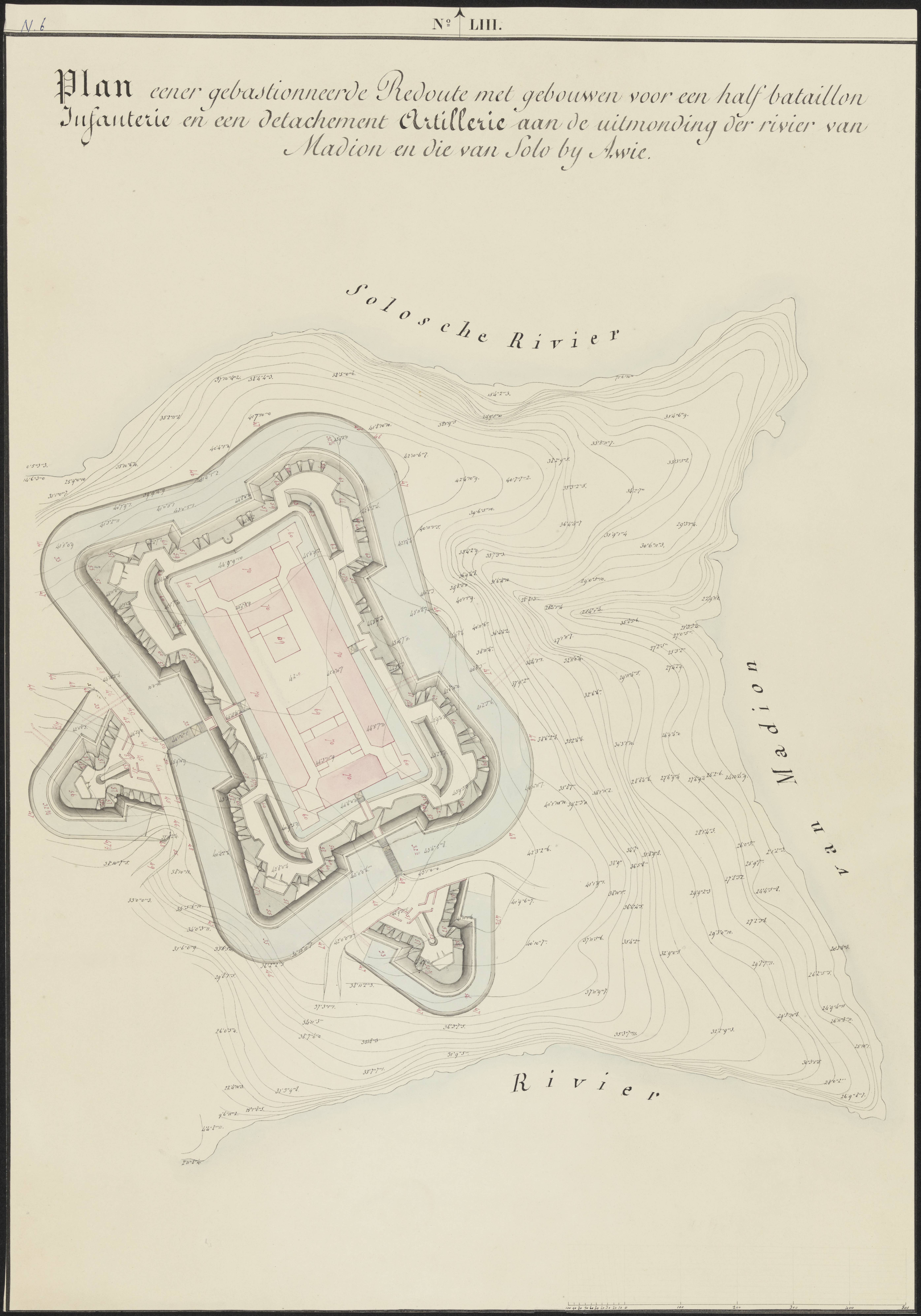
Design sketch of Fort van den Bosch, ca. 1845

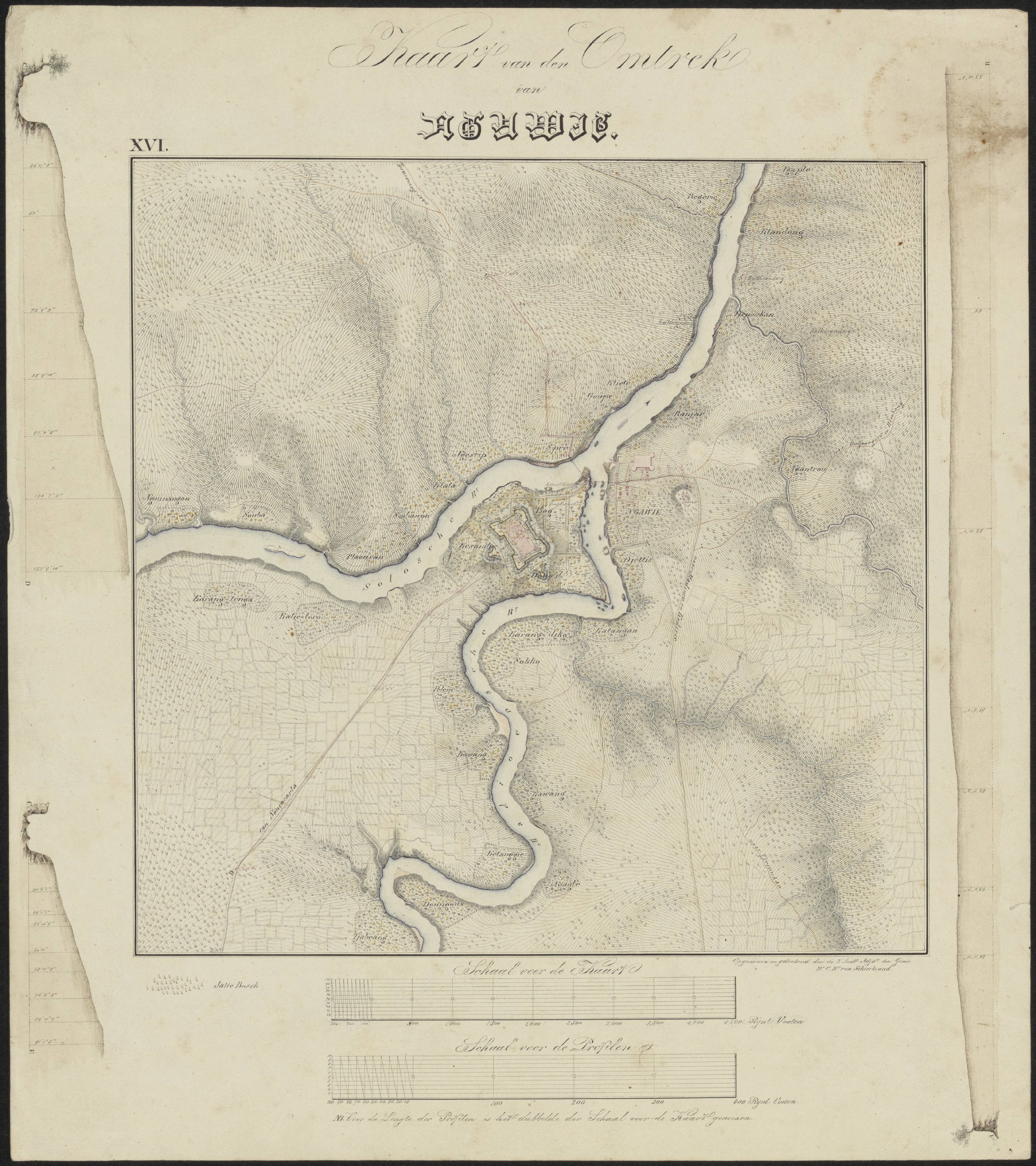
Topographical map of area around Fort van den Bosch (Ngawi), ca. 1845

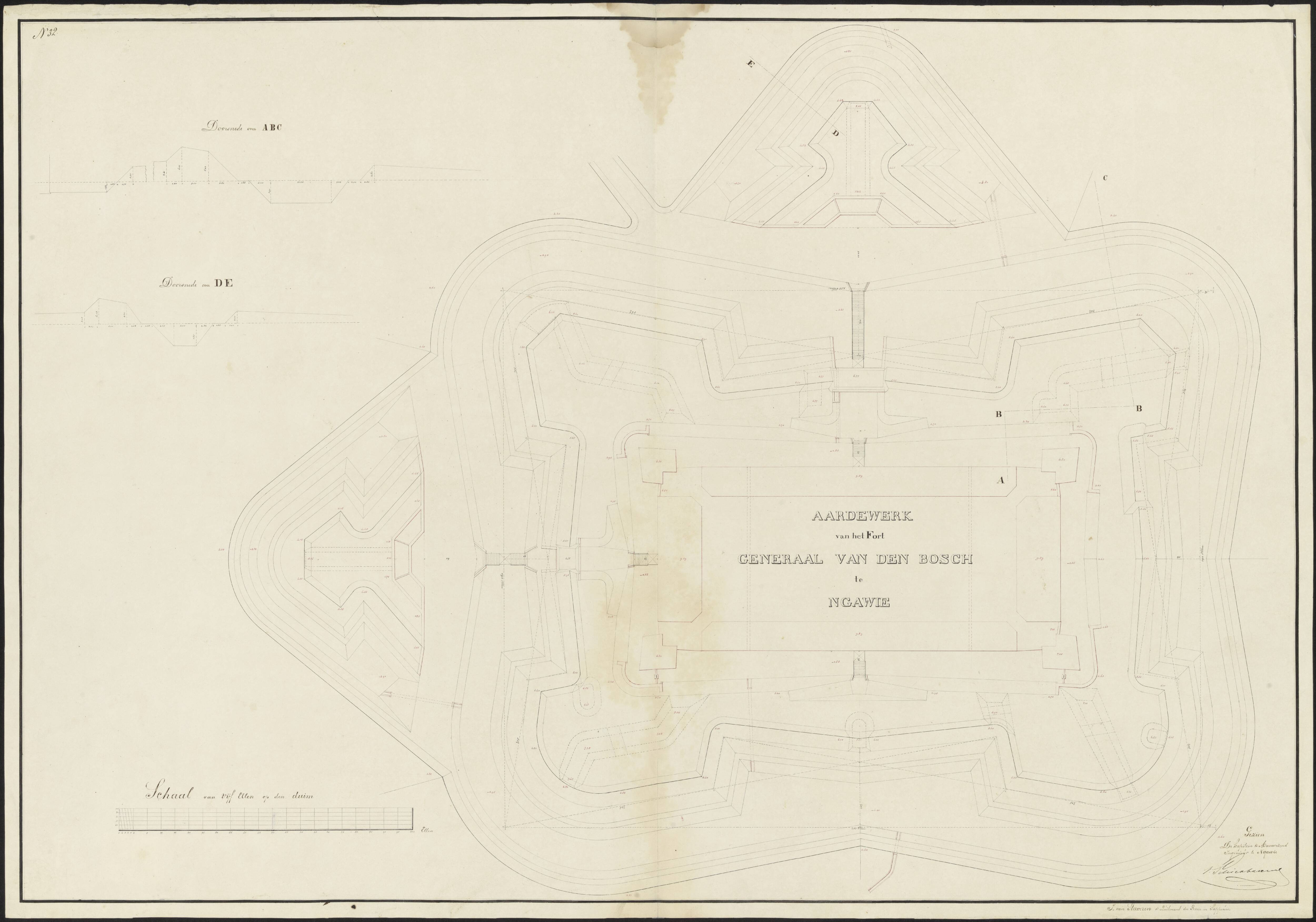
Design sketch of Fort van den Bosch (earthwork defences), ca. 1845

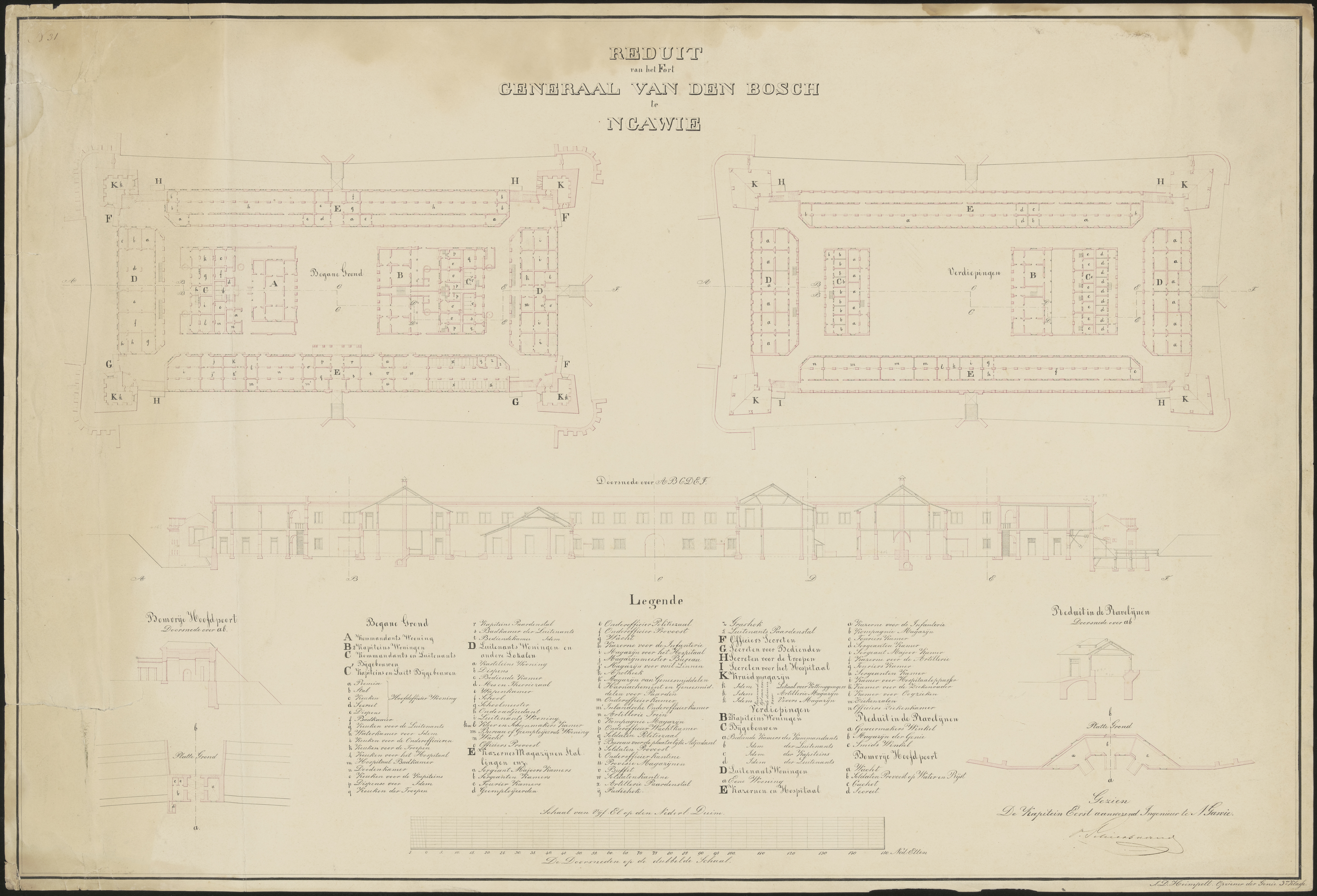
Design sketch of Reduit (inner defences and buildings) of Fort van den Bosch, ca. 1845

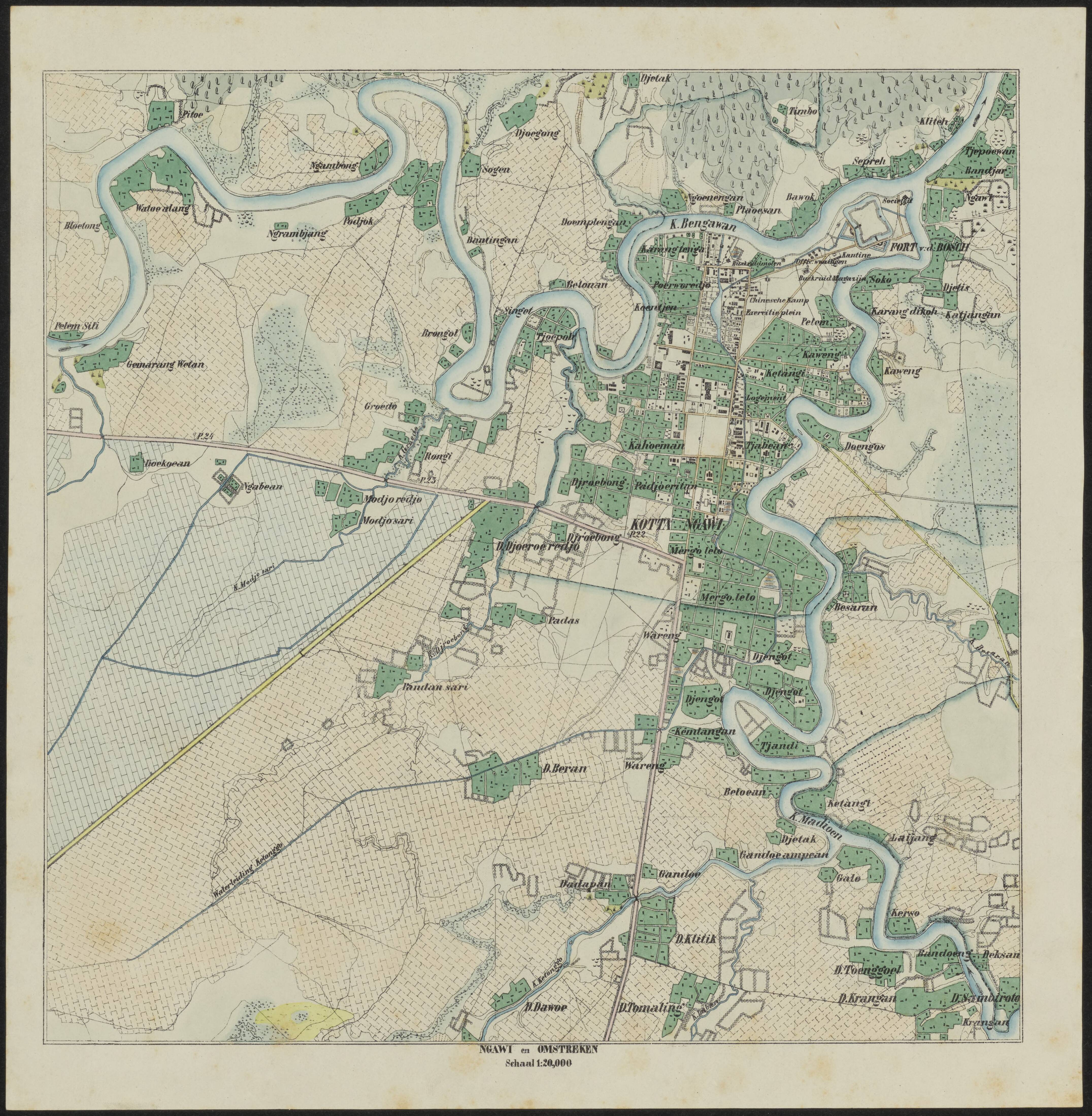
Topographical map of Ngawi and surroundings, ca. 1872
