= Funatsu Station =

Funatsu Station may refer to:

- Funatsu Station (Toba, Mie), a railway station in Toba, Mie Prefecture, Japan
- Funatsu Station (Kihoku, Mie), a railway station in Kihoku, Mie Prefecture, Japan
