= Mitsushima =

Coordinates: 35.275251°N 137.852137°E

Camp Commander Lt. Sukeo Nakajima leads the first anniversary memorial service to commemorate the 45 prisoners who died in the first year at the camp. November 26, 1943.

Mitsushima, also known as Matsushima, Tokyo No. 2 Detached Camp, Tokyo #3B, and Tokyo 20, was a prisoner of war camp that provided labour to build the Hiraoka Dam on the Tenryū River in the Central Highlands in Japan.

Tatsuo Tsuchiya (also known as "Little Glass Eye") was the first Japanese to be convicted of war crimes at the Yokohama War Crimes Trials. Six guards, including the commander, were executed whilst another four guards (including Tsuchiya) received life sentences for causing the deaths of 48 prisoners.

== See also ==
- Kanose POW Camp
- Tofuku Maru
- List of POW camps in Japan
