= Tōfuku Maru =

Japanese Dai-ichi Taifuku Maru-class

Coordinates: 33.59°N 136.14°E

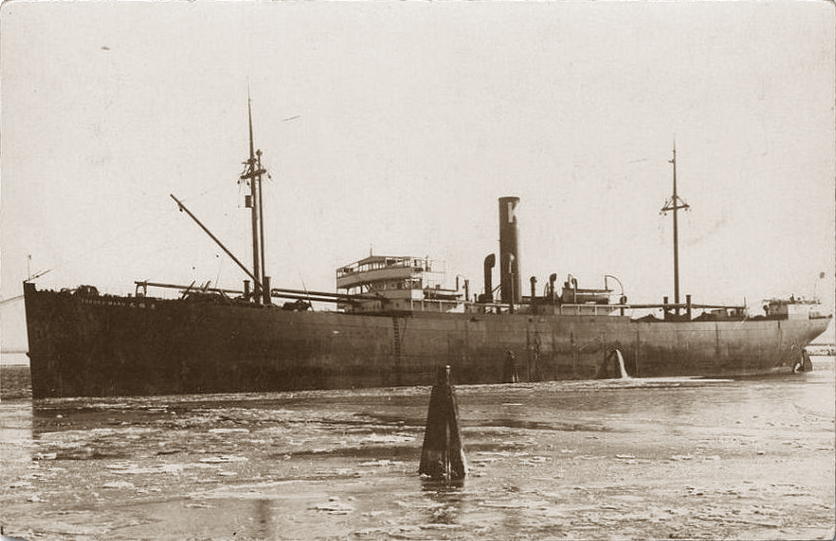
- Tōfuku Maru

History

Japan
- Name: Tōfuku Maru
- Owner: Daiko Shosen K.K.
- Port of registry: Kobe
- Builder: Kawasaki Dockyard Co. Ltd.
- Launched: 1919
- Out of service: 24 December 1943
- Fate: Torpedoed and sunk 24 December 1943

General characteristics
- Type: Cargo ship
- Tonnage: 5,857 GRT
- Length: 117.3 m (384 ft 10 in)
- Beam: 15.5 m (50 ft 10 in)
- Height: 11 m (36 ft 1 in)
- Installed power: 436 nhp
- Propulsion: Triple expansion engines
- Speed: Approximately 14 knots (26 km/h; 16 mph)

Tōfuku Maru (東福丸) was a Japanese Dai-ichi Taifuku Maru-class cargo ship and hellship.

== Hellship ==
Between October 27 and November 27, 1942 the vessel transported 1,200 Allied prisoners of war (POWs) and 600 Japanese Army troops between Singapore and Moji, Japan. Twenty-seven prisoners died during the journey, the result of poor hygiene conditions on the ship. A further 130 were carried off the ship on stretchers and as many as 100 died later.

On 24 December 1943, USS Gurnard torpedoed and sunk Tōfuku Maru off the east coast of Honshu, Japan.

== War crimes trial ==
During a Singapore War Crimes trial, the ship's master Shiro Otsu and Serjeant Major Eiji Yoshinari were tried for war crimes that caused the deaths of prisoners on the voyage. During the trial it was found that the POWs (a mix of American, Dutch, Australian and British) were crammed into two holding areas with an average area of 5 men per 6 square feet (0.56 m^{2}) and that toiletry facilities and foods were insufficient for their needs. On 11 June 1947, Otsu was found guilty and Yoshinari was acquitted.

== Related links ==
- Mitsushima POW Camp
- Kanose POW Camp
- List of Japanese hell ships
