= Kanose =

Coordinates: 37.700280°N 139.485855°E

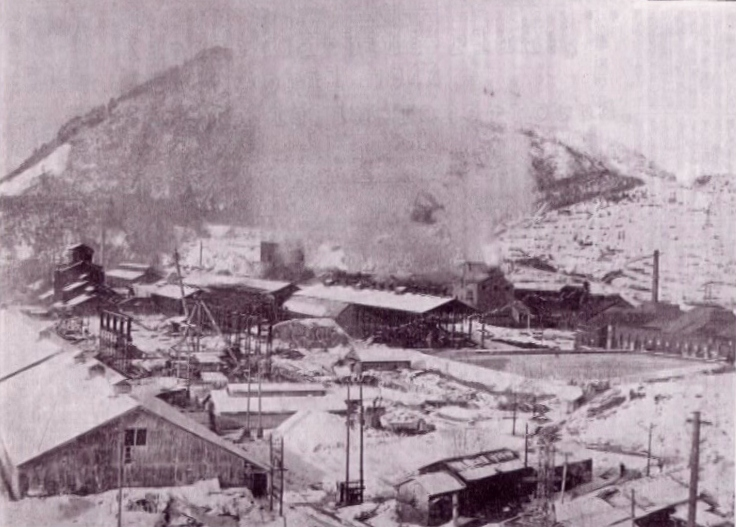
Tokyo #16B Prisoner of War Camp in the foreground of the Showa Denko Carbide Plant, Kanose, Christmas 1944.

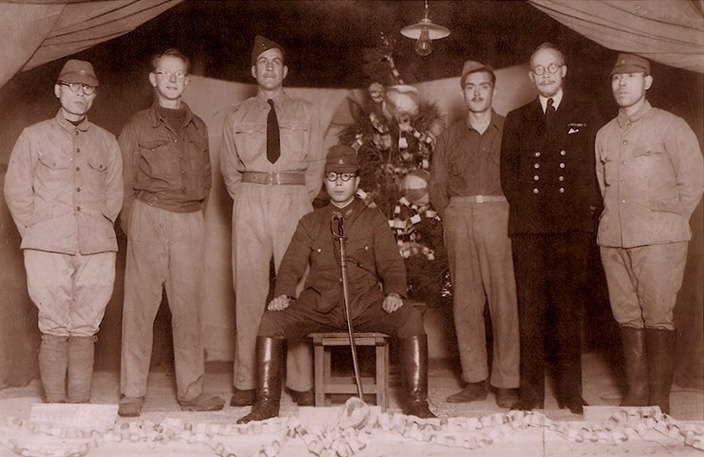
Kiyoji Ishibe, Capt. Janis Morris, Fl/Lt. Leslie H. Chater, Camp Commander 1st Lt. Hiroshi Azuma (seated), Capt. Walter Hewitt, Ship's Surgeon John Joseph Laing, and Shinro (or Noburo) Ichiyanagi. Kanose POW Camp, Christmas 1944.

Kanose, also known as Tokyo 16B, was a prisoner of war camp during the Second World War located in the Showa Denko Carbide Plant at Kanose, Niigata in Japan.

The first 100 prisoners at the camp came from Mitsushima POW Camp. Of these, one died from malnutrition (the result of fellow POWs stealing his meals), and a further three died from burns in a furnace accident at the carbide plant.

On July 26, 1945, the B-29 Superfortress Straight Flush of the 509th Composite Group dropped a pumpkin bomb on the camp, narrowly missing it.

Eight guards and work supervisors were tried at the Yokohama War Crimes Trials for acts of brutality and stealing Red Cross parcels. Sentences ranged between one and a half years to twenty-five years. The camp commander, Hiroshi Azuma, received clemency largely due to his acts of intervention against his guards and his compassion towards prisoners.

After the war, NHK Japan broadcast a drama called Christmas in Kanose, based on the Christmas 1944 concert run by the prisoners and directed by POW Frank Smith, from the West End of London .

== See also ==
- Mitsushima POW Camp
- Tofuku Maru
- List of POW camps in Japan
