= Hiraoka Dam =

Coordinates: 35°16′57″N 137°50′48″E

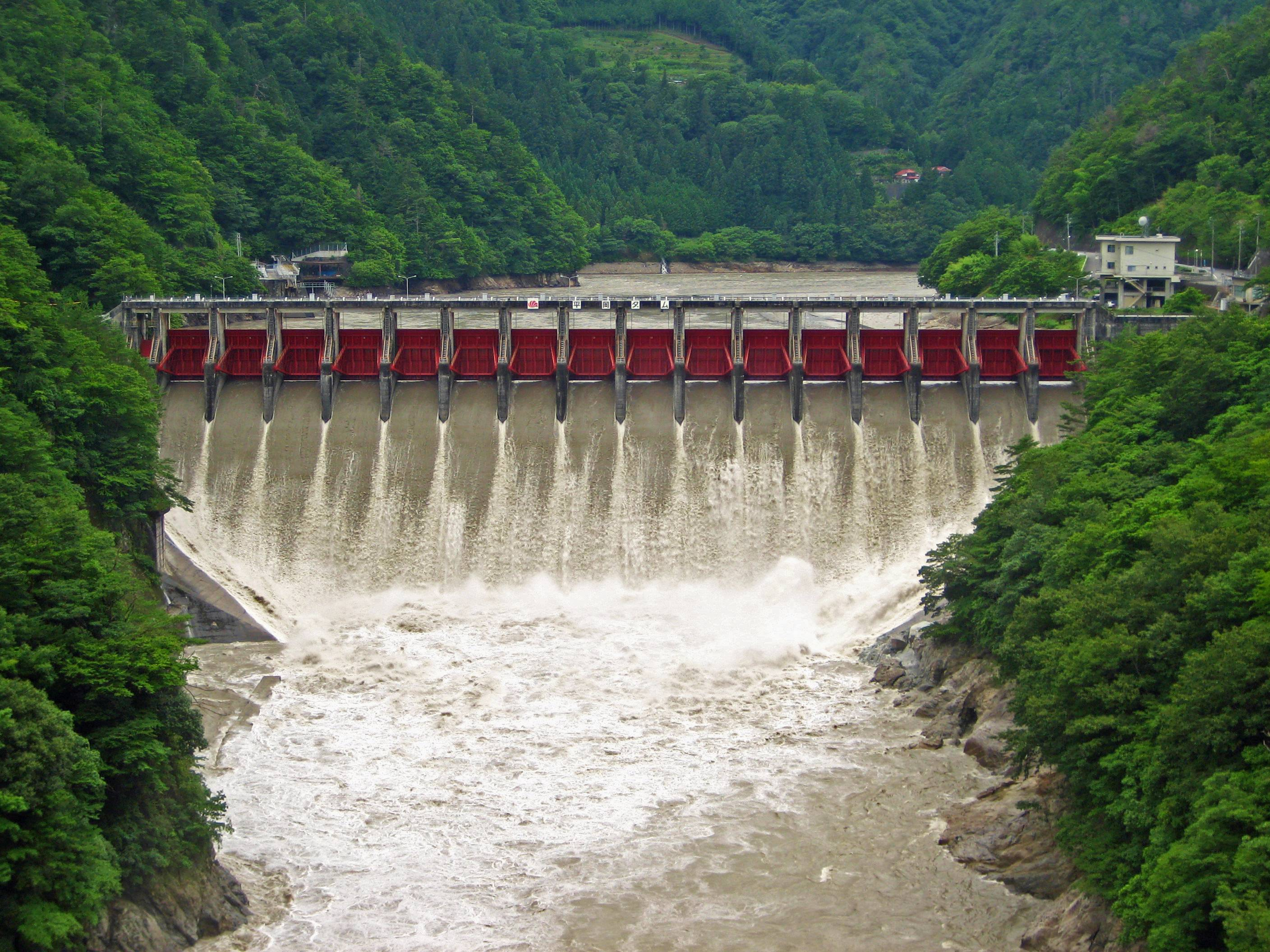
- Interactive map of Hiraoka Dam
- Location: Tenryū, Nagano, Japan
- Construction began: 1938
- Opening date: 1951

Dam and spillways
- Type of dam: Concrete gravity dam
- Impounds: Tenryū River
- Height: 62.5 m (205 ft)
- Length: 258 m (846 ft)
- Dam volume: 252,000 m^{3}

Reservoir
- Total capacity: 42,425,000 m^{3}
- Catchment area: 3,650 km^{2}
- Surface area: 258 ha

Hiraoka Dam (平岡ダム, Hiraoka damu) is a dam in Tenryū, Nagano Prefecture, Japan, completed in 1951. It is located on the Tenryū River upstream from the Sakuma Dam.

During the Second World War prisoners of war held at Tokyo #2D (Mitsushima) Prisoner of War Camp provided labour to build the penstock tunnel to the powerstation, collect aggregate, and mix cement for the construction of the dam between November 1942 and August 1945. Fifty seven prisoners died from diseases relating to poor sanitary, diet, and climate conditions.

== See also ==
- List of dams and reservoirs in Japan
