= Fukuoka 17 =

Coordinates: 33.014°N 130.456°E

Fukuoka #17 - Omuta, Branch Prisoner of War Camp was a Japanese prisoner-of-war work camp located at the Mitsui Kozan Miike Kogyo-Sho coal mine and Mitsui Zinc Foundry in Shinminato-machi, Omuta-shi, Fukuoka-ken, Japan, during World War II. It was the largest POW camp in Japan.

== History ==
The camp was opened on 7 August 1943 with 500 Americans arriving on the hellship Clyde Maru from the Philippines. It was gradually populated to about 1,757 by Allied prisoners of war of mixed nationalities, mostly Australian, American, British and Dutch. The British, Dutch and Australians were survivors of the Burma Railway construction in Thailand (Siam). The last group to arrive were all Australians, in June 1945; they had formerly been held in the Fukuoka 13-D Oita POW camp. There were also Norwegians, Czechs, Portuguese, Saudi Arabians, Canadian, British Indian, British West Indian, Malayan, Chinese, and British Guianan POWs, as well as civilians.

The site was originally the labourers' quarters built by the Mitsui Coal Mining Company owned by the Baron Mitsui. The camp was gradually expanded with further buildings constructed over the years.

== Description ==
The camp measured 200 yards by 1000 yards and was surrounded by a 12 feet high wooden fence fixed with heavy gauge wire. There were 33 barracks, all one story buildings 120' x 16' with ten rooms to a barracks. Officers were billeted three or four per room measuring 9' x 10', with four to six enlisted men accommodated in rooms of same size. There was no heating whatsoever, which was a serious problem in the winter months as the men were living on starvation diets.

There were two meals served each day, usually one cup of rice and some radish soup. Protein was rarely provided.

The camp commandant was Asao Fukuhara, who was executed after the war for war crimes. The camp doctor was an unidentified Japanese surgeon who forced men to work even when critically ill.

Baron Mitsui's company leased the POWs from the Japanese Army, who received payment from the Company of about 20 yen per day. The American, Australian and Dutch POWs all worked in the Mitsui coal mine whilst all the British worked in the nearby Mitsui zinc foundry. Pay for privates and NCOs was 10 yen per day and all POWs received about 5 cigarettes each day.

Baron Mitsui liked to visit the camp and seemed to enjoy seeing the POWs. He sometimes provided costumes so that the POWs could put on musicals that he and the guards would watch. When the war ended, he invited camp officers to dinner with his wife.

The camp was liberated on 2 September 1945, by which time most of the POWs were in a desperate state of health. Many were suffering from severe beri-beri and on average had lost about 60 lb (27 kg). Camp survivors were evacuated via the destroyed Nagasaki about ten days after liberation. War correspondent George Weller interviewed many of the men who were released. These interviews can be found in a book edited by his son Anthony Weller, First Into Nagasaki: The Censored Eyewitness Dispatches on Post-Atomic Japan and Its Prisoners of War.
