= Sekiguchi =

Sekiguchi (written: 関口) is a Japanese surname. Notable people with the surname include:

- Fusao Sekiguchi Japanese industrialist
- Gen Sekiguchi Japanese film director
- Hisao Sekiguchi Japanese footballer
- Isamu Sekiguchi (関口 勇; born 1910), Japanese skier
- Hideaki Sekiguchi, known as "Billy" or "Bass Wolf", original bassist for Japanese rock band Guitar Wolf
- Kazuyuki Sekiguchi Japanese musician
- Kunimitsu Sekiguchi Japanese footballer
- Mai Sekiguchi Japanese actress
- Masakazu Sekiguchi Japanese politician
- Taro Sekiguchi Japanese motorcycle racer
- Yuhi Sekiguchi Japanese race driver
- The Sekiguchi Corporation invented the Monchhichi doll.
