= Ichioka =

Ichioka (written: 一岡/市岡) is a Japanese surname. Notable people with the surname include:

- Ryuji Ichioka (born 1991), Japanese baseball player
- Sarah Ichioka, British-American writer
- Toshiye Ichioka (1912–1995), American actress better known as Toshia Mori
- Yuji Ichioka (1936–2002), American historian and activist

== See also ==
- Ichioka Station (市岡駅, Ichioka-eki), a train station in Niimi, Okayama Prefecture, Japan
