= Australia in the Second Boer War =

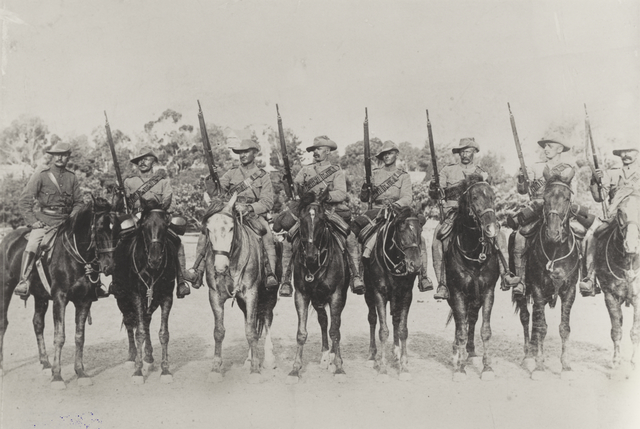
South Australian Mounted Rifles training near Adelaide, c. 1900, prior to deploying to South Africa

The military history of Australia during the Boer War is complex, and includes a period of history in which the six formerly autonomous British Australian colonies federated to become the Commonwealth of Australia. At the outbreak of the Second Boer War, each of these separate colonies maintained their own, independent military forces, but by the cessation of hostilities, these six armies had come under a centralised command to form the Australian Army.

Towards the end of the nineteenth century, an escalating conflict between the British Empire and the Boer republics of southern Africa, led to the outbreak of the Second Boer War, which lasted from 11 October 1899, until 31 May 1902. In a show of support for the empire, the governments of the self-governing British colonies of Canada, New Zealand, Natal, Cape Colony and the six Australian colonies all offered men to participate in the conflict. The Australian contingents, numbering over 16,000 men, were the largest contribution from the Empire, and a further 7,000 Australian men served with other colonial or irregular units. At least 60 Australian women also served in the conflict as nurses.

== Background ==
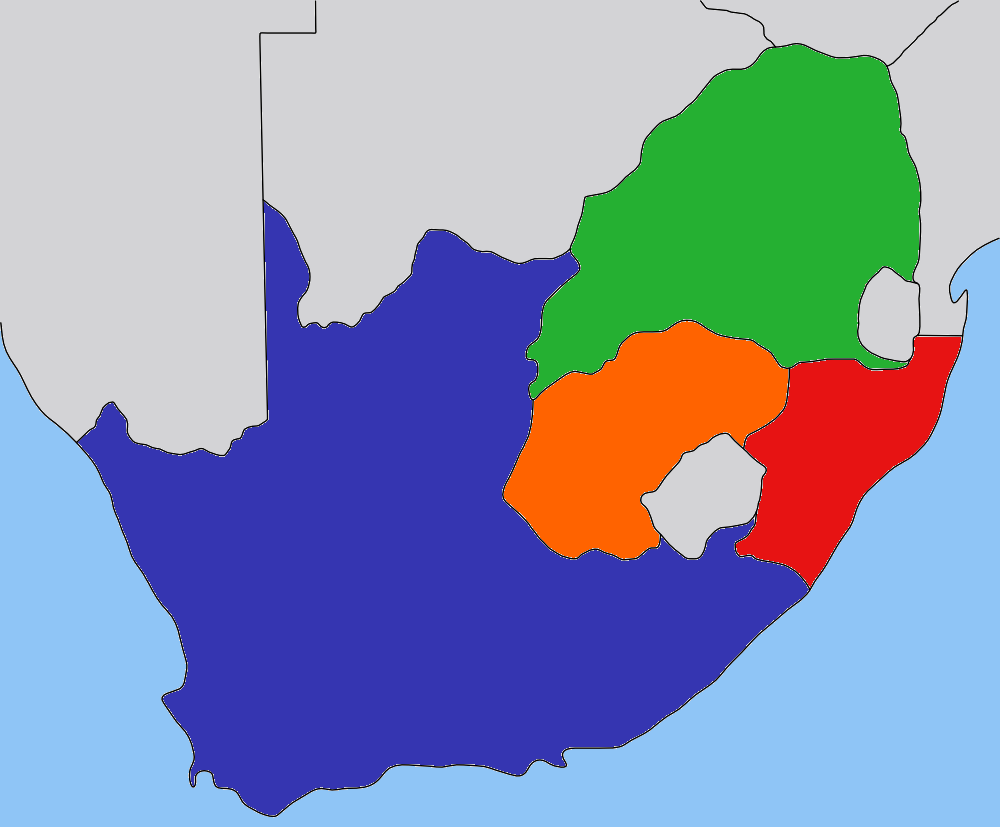
The geography of the region; the South African Republic/Transvaal (green), with the Orange Free State (orange), the British Cape Colony (blue), and the Natal (red).

Great Britain first gained control of the southern tip of Africa during the Napoleonic Wars. The Dutch East India Company built the first Cape settlement in 1652, bringing southern Africa into the Dutch Empire. In 1795 revolutionary France invaded and occupied the Dutch Republic, and established a puppet allied-state there, known as the Batavian Republic. All the former colonies of the Dutch Republic came under the control of the Batavian Republic, who were allied to France, Britain's enemy in the French Revolutionary Wars.

Realising the Cape's strategic importance for control of the seas and access to India and the Far East, Britain attacked the Batavian Republic's outpost at the Cape of Good Hope in the Battle of Muizenberg. The British victory in the battle brought about the establishment of the Cape Colony. Although it was briefly returned to the Batavian Republic in 1803 under the Treaty of Amiens, a resumption of hostilities saw Britain again take control of the Cape Colony in 1806 following the Battle of Blaauwberg. This battle established permanent British rule over the Cape.

Unhappy with British rule, the Southern African Dutch, known as Boers, migrated further north, establishing the South African Republic (Transvaal Republic), Natal, and the Orange Free State. British imperial and commercial interests increasingly impinged on the Boer republics, who resented British influence in their affairs. The majority of the territory of Natal was annexed by the British in 1843, and although the British government formally recognised the two remaining Boer republics in the 1850s, they then annexed the Transvaal in 1877. Tired of British aggression towards them, the Boers finally hit back, leading to the outbreak of the First Boer War. Lasting from 16 December 1880 until 23 March 1881, the First Boer War was a humiliating reversal for the British, who suffered a disastrous loss at the Battle of Majuba Hill on 27 February 1881, and were compelled to sign the Pretoria Convention, which granted the South African Republic self-government under a nominal British suzerainty.

Just six years later in 1886, gold was discovered in the Republic, and a large influx of British prospectors (referred to as uitlanders by the Boers) increasingly led to confrontation with the Boers. What began as an internal problem for the South African Republic soon became an international problem, as Britain sought to protect, and even extend the rights of its citizens within the South African Republic. Britain had been unhappy with the outcome of the First Boer War, and wished to restore influence over the Transvaal.

Under the pretext of negotiating uitlander rights, Britain sought to gain control over the gold and diamond mining industries, and demanded a franchising policy, which they knew would be unacceptable to the Boers. When the negotiations failed to come to an acceptable outcome, British foreign secretary Joseph Chamberlain issued an ultimatum to the South African Republic. Realising that war was inevitable, President Paul Kruger gave Britain a 48-hour deadline to withdraw its troops from their borders. When Britain failed to comply, the South African Republic, along with their allies, the Transvaal and the Orange Free State declared war on Britain and set about launching pre-emptive strikes into British held territory.

== Outbreak of hostilities ==
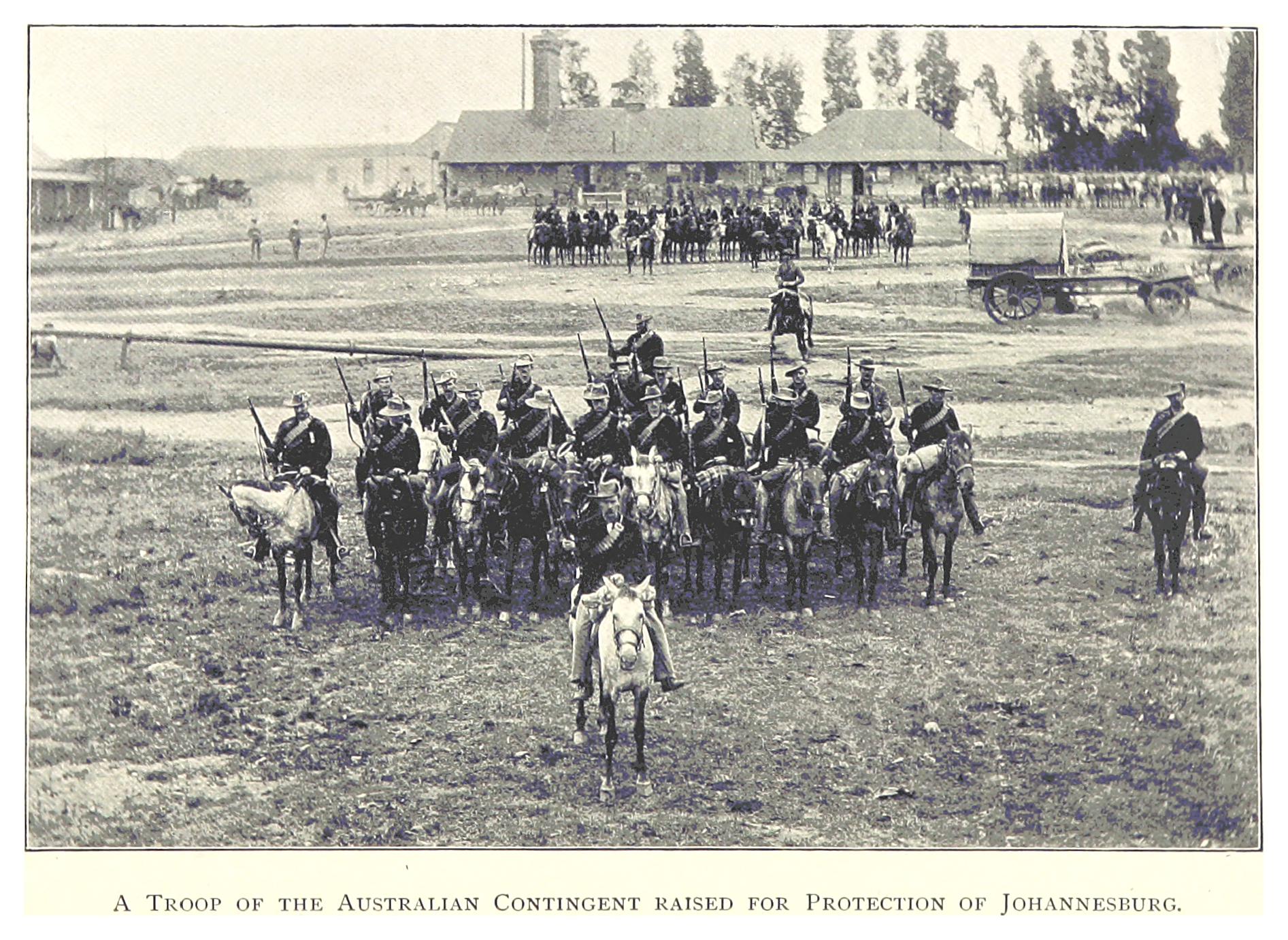
A troop of the Australian Contingent raised for the protection of Johannesburg (1899).

A Boer force of mostly farmer volunteers, formed up as mounted infantry, armed primarily with German built Mauser Model 1895 rifles. The effectiveness and superiority of this weapon over the British Lee–Metford and Lee–Enfield Mark I, led to the development of the Pattern 1913 Enfield, and the upgrading of the Lee–Enfield to the SMLE Mark III, which would be the stock rifle of choice for most British Empire armies in World War I. These highly mobile mounted infantry formed the basis of the Boer Commando, which was the primary organisational unit of the Boers.

At the outbreak of hostilities, a superior rifle was not the only advantage held by the Boers. The British forces in southern Africa were still composed mostly of infantry, while most of the Boers were skilled horsemen, who used their superior mobility to good advantage. Realising that continuing to engage the British in set-piece battles where British troops could utilize their superior numbers would result in a quick defeat, the Boers adopted tactics of hit-and-run guerilla attacks, picking off men, and disrupting supply lines.

The Boers first struck at the Battle of Kraaipan on 12 October 1899. Late at night, 800 commandos rode south into the Cape Colony, attacking the British garrison at Kraaipan and cutting railway and telegraph lines. Although the British repelled their advance at the Battle of Talana Hill, and the Battle of Elandslaagte, the Boers continued to pour south, besieging the British settlement of Ladysmith and advancing on Mafeking and Kimberley.

As the Boers established siege-guns around Ladysmith, the British commander of the garrison there, Sir George Stuart White, attempted a sortie with cavalry against the Boer gun positions, but the attack was a disaster, and a state of siege followed as both side attempted to consolidate their position.

== Arrival of the Australians ==
The involvement of men from the Australian colonies in the Second Boer War was complex. They included the official contingents dispatched by each of the six colonial governments, Australians who were already in southern Africa working as gold-miners enlisting in British or Cape Colony regiments such as the Bushveldt Carbineers, men who made their own way to participate, and others who joined privately raised units such as Doyle's Australian Scouts. After Australia federated to become the Commonwealth of Australia, the men of the six separate colonial contingents were reorganised into new Commonwealth contingents. Although in a minority, some Australians were anti-imperialists, and supported the Boer cause. Although their number is uncertain, it is known that some Australians, such as Arthur Alfred Lynch, participated in the conflict on the Boer side. Upon the outbreak of hostilities, the British government initially requested troops from New South Wales, which had previously provided the New South Wales Lancers serving in the Mahdist War in Sudan. Although they were armed with rifles, the NSW Lancers did go into action during the Boer War charging with their lances on more than one occasion.

As planning advanced, and the need for troop numbers increased, this request was soon forwarded to each of the colonies. The War Office devised a plan for two contingents of 125 men each from New South Wales and Victoria, and one contingent of 125 men each from Queensland, South Australia, Tasmania, and Western Australia, to be attached to separate British units. The six colonial governments each held their own parliamentary debates about the support that would be offered. Although there were elements of opposition within each government, support was general and widespread in each colony.

Britain realised the value of troops from the Australian colonies. The climates and geography of Southern Africa and Australia were quite similar, and most Australian soldiers, the vast majority of whom were trained as mounted rifles, were well-suited to operating in such terrain. Britain was also quick to understand the need for further horsemen, as the Boers operated with a high degree of mobility across the Southern African grasslands, often referred to romantically as 'the vastness of the veldt'. At that time, most British troops were recruited from within urban environments, and although their ability as soldiers was not questioned, they did not have the natural horsemanship and bush craft of the Australians, many of whom came from rural backgrounds.

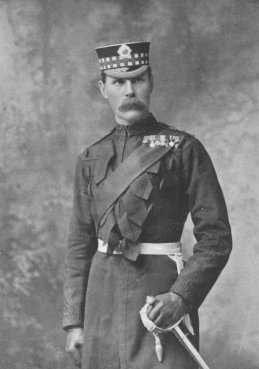
Lord Methuen, who had overall command of the British column which the NSW Lancers joined.

The Australian contribution consisted of five phases. The first was the contingents each government dispatched in response to the outbreak of the war. Although hostilities only commenced on 10 October 1899, the first squadron of New South Wales Lancers arrived in Cape Town on 2 November to join the British force assembled under the command of General Sir Redvers Henry Buller. The Lancers had been training in England at the time, and were quickly dispatched to southern Africa as soon as permission was received from the Government of New South Wales.

By 22 November the Lancers were already conducting patrols, and were soon attacked near Belmont, where they forced their attackers to withdraw after inflicting serious casualties upon them. The NSW Lancers were again called into action at the Battle of Modder River, where along with Lord Methuen's British column, they attempted to relieve the siege of Kimberley. Although they forced the Boers to retreat, the British suffered heavy casualties in the attempt, and also had to withdraw, allowing the Boers to re-establish their trench lines.

As they had less distance to travel, the Western Australian contingent, consisting solely of the 1st Western Australian Mounted Infantry arrived in mid-November, were the first to arrive directly from Australia, and were quickly dispatched for Natal. On 26 November, the first contingents of infantry from South Australia (1st South Australian Mounted Rifles), Tasmania (Tasmanian Mounted Infantry), Victoria (1st Victorian Mounted Rifles) and Western Australia arrived in Cape Town, and despite retaining their own independent commands, for logistical reasons they were designated as the '1st Australian Regiment', and came under overall command of Major-General Sir John Charles Hoad. The 1st Queensland Mounted Infantry had also arrived to join them by mid-December. Another mounted infantry unit from New South Wales, known as the 1st Australian Horse, also arrived in December. Despite their name, they were raised purely from within the Colony of New South Wales, although this unit would go on to become the precursor of the first Australian Light Horse unit. Hoad ordered the combined force to ride north towards the Orange River, where they were to link up with the Kimberley Relief Force under Lieutenant-General Lord Methuen.

Although they were in the Cape Colony at the time, no units from the Australian colonies were involved in the Black Week between 10 and 17 December, in which Britain suffered three successive defeats at the Battle of Stormberg, the Battle of Magersfontein, and the Battle of Colenso. The Boers knew that Empire forces would be sent to reinforce the British positions, and so sought to strike quickly against them.

By mid-December, the first two contingents of New South Wales Mounted Rifles (A Squadron and E Squadron), and the first contingent of Queensland Mounted Infantry (1st Queensland Mounted infantry) had both also arrived directly from Australia.

== Aboriginal soldiers ==
Until recently it was thought that approximately 50 Aboriginal trackers went to South Africa to serve with the British forces against the Boers during the Boer War (1899–1902), after being personally requested by Lord Kitchener. The role that they supposedly played during the war was described in an article 'The Black Trackers of Bloemfontein' in Land Rights magazine (1990) by Indigenous historian David Huggonson. Several historians, including Dr Dale Kerwin, an Indigenous research fellow at Griffith University, determined that the lack of surviving information about these Aboriginal trackers was partially due to the uncertainty around whether they had managed to return to Australia. Dr Kerwin claimed that a group of fifty black trackers may not have been allowed to return to Australia at the end of the war in 1902 due to the White Australia Policy.

According to extensive research by independent scholar, Peter Bakker (Melbourne), the 'fifty black trackers' story is a myth that arose from the misinterpretation of a few scant historical documents. Bakker's research arguably debunks the 'fifty black trackers' claim and challenges the entire narrative regarding Aboriginal participation in the Boer War. His research has led to the recognition of several Aboriginal men who saw service as regular privates or troopers who earned their place in their units on the basis of being capable horsemen, good shots with a rifle and their hardy bushcraft skills. Of the ten identified men of Aboriginal descent who had served in the Boer War (as of 2020) Bakker found that only one did not return to Australia. Contrary to prevailing narrative, Bakker also found that none of the identified men served as trackers for their units or were from Queensland, where historians presumed most of the Aboriginal participants in the war to have originated.

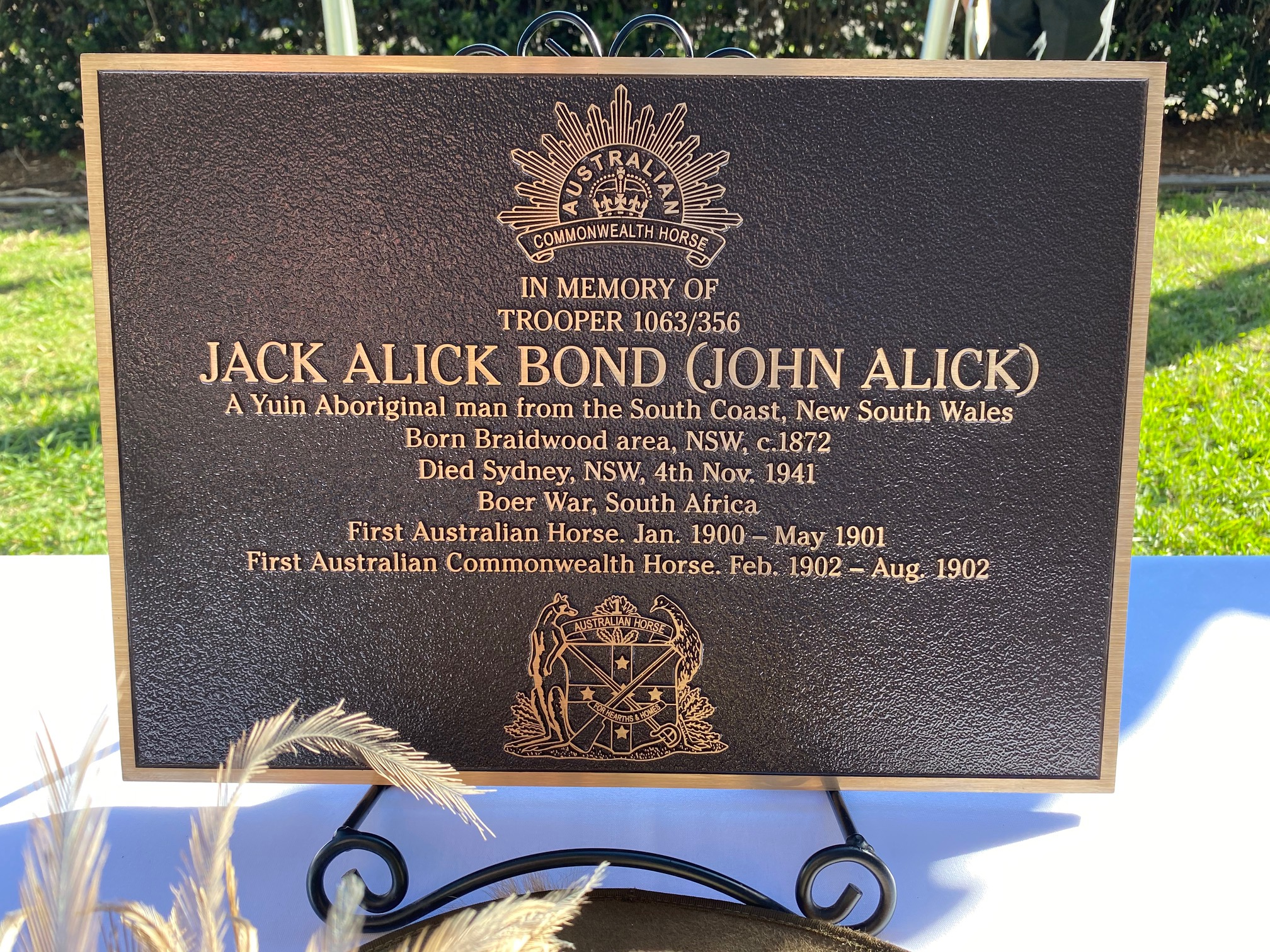
Jack Alick Bond's grave plaque recognising his two tours of service during the Boer War

In the months prior to the departure of the first Federal Contingent, The 1st Australian Commonwealth Horse, on the 18 February 1902, a short article titled "The Melbourne Enrolment" appeared in The Queenslander on 25 January 1902, stating that: "the number of men so far attested for the Federal Contingent is 212. Two black trackers. Davis and F. King, have been taken on the strength". On 18 February 1902 a photograph appeared in the Town and Country Journal, which included a photograph of a man labelled "F King Black Tracker". According to Bakker's research, there is no evidence that Davis or F. King departed with this unit for overseas service but another Aboriginal man did: Jack Alick Bond. Jack's image can be seen numbered as 67 in a group photograph directly above that of F. King on the same page in the Australian Town and Country Journal. A Yuin Aboriginal man, Jack Alick Bond, from Krawarree, New South Wales, has the unique distinction of not only having served in two tours of active duty in the Boer War but also receiving his Queen's South Africa medal in person from the Duke of Cornwall and York during the Royal Visit to Sydney on 30 May 1901. Jack Alick Bond had worked as a police tracker prior to enlisting as Trooper 1063 in a New South Wales colonial unit, the First Australian Horse, in 1900. Jack re-enlisted for a second tour as Trooper 356 in the First 1st Australian Commonwealth Horse in January 1902. Other men of Aboriginal descent that served in Boer War include Robert Charles Searle (Western Australia), William Charles Westbury (South Australia), Arthur Wellington (Victoria) and William Stubbings (New South Wales).

== Counter-offensives ==
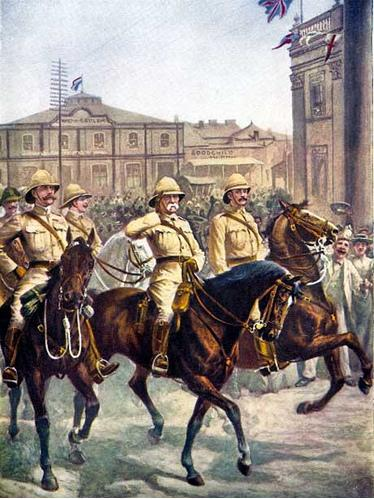
Lord Roberts enters the city of Kimberley following the relief of the besieged city in February 1900

The beginning of 1900 saw the first Australian contingents deploying to the north of the Cape Colony. The new year begun much as the previous one had ended though, with the British suffering a further defeat at the Battle of Spion Kop on 23 and 24 January, adding to the set-backs of Black Week. Despite the defeat at Spion Kop, reinforcements were flooding in from both Britain and the Empire. The 1st New South Wales Mounted Rifles, 'A' Field Battery of the NSW Artillery, the NSW Medical Team, and the 2nd Victorian Mounted Rifles all arrived in February, and the 2nd Queensland Mounted Infantry arrived in March. These Australian units joined the British forces being assembled by Lord Roberts, who had replaced General Buller in January, following concerns over his leadership through the bleak losses of the previous December.

Lord Roberts was placed in command of a five-division strong force of reinforcements sent to launch a counter-invasion of the Orange Free State. By mid-February his force amounted to over 180,000 men, the largest British expeditionary force deployed on overseas operations up to that date. His original plan had involved his column conducting an offensive north along the railway from Cape Town to Bloemfontein, and onto Pretoria. When they progressed north, they discovered the beleaguered forces under siege at Ladysmith and Kimberley. Upon discovering the nature of the situation with the sieges, Roberts broke his force up into several detachments to deal with each of the sieges. One force was commanded by Lieutenant-General John French, and consisted primarily of cavalry. French's detachment also included the New South Wales Lancers, Queensland Mounted Infantry, and New South Wales Army Medical Corps.

The British victory at Modder River had finally permitted the relief of Kimberley, and the retreating Boers were chased down and again engaged at the Battle of Paardeberg which took place between 18 and 27 February 1900. The New South Wales Mounted Rifles and 1st Queensland Mounted Infantry both took part in this engagement, with the NSW Rifles managing to capture the Boer General Piet Cronjé. His capture caused a massive blow to Boer morale over the rest of the conflict. The British column broke the siege of Ladysmith on 28 February, and entered Bloemfontein on 13 March. Despite suffering heavy casualties from both battle and disease, the British continued to drive on towards Pretoria.

The second wave of units from the Australian colonies began to arrive in April. This wave consisted primarily of the Bushmen contingents. The men for these newly raised units were recruited from a wide range of locales and had been primarily funded through either public subscription, or the donations of wealthy citizens who wished to be seen as contributing to the war effort. These units were again mounted infantry, and consisted of men with a natural skill at horsemanship, riflery and bushcraft who were thought to be able to counter the skills of the Boer Commandoes. The 1st Bushmen Contingent (NSW), Queensland Citizen Bushmen, South Australian Citizen Bushmen, Tasmanian Citizen Bushmen, Victorian Citizen Bushmen, and Western Australian Citizen Bushmen all landed and headed towards Rhodesia in April.

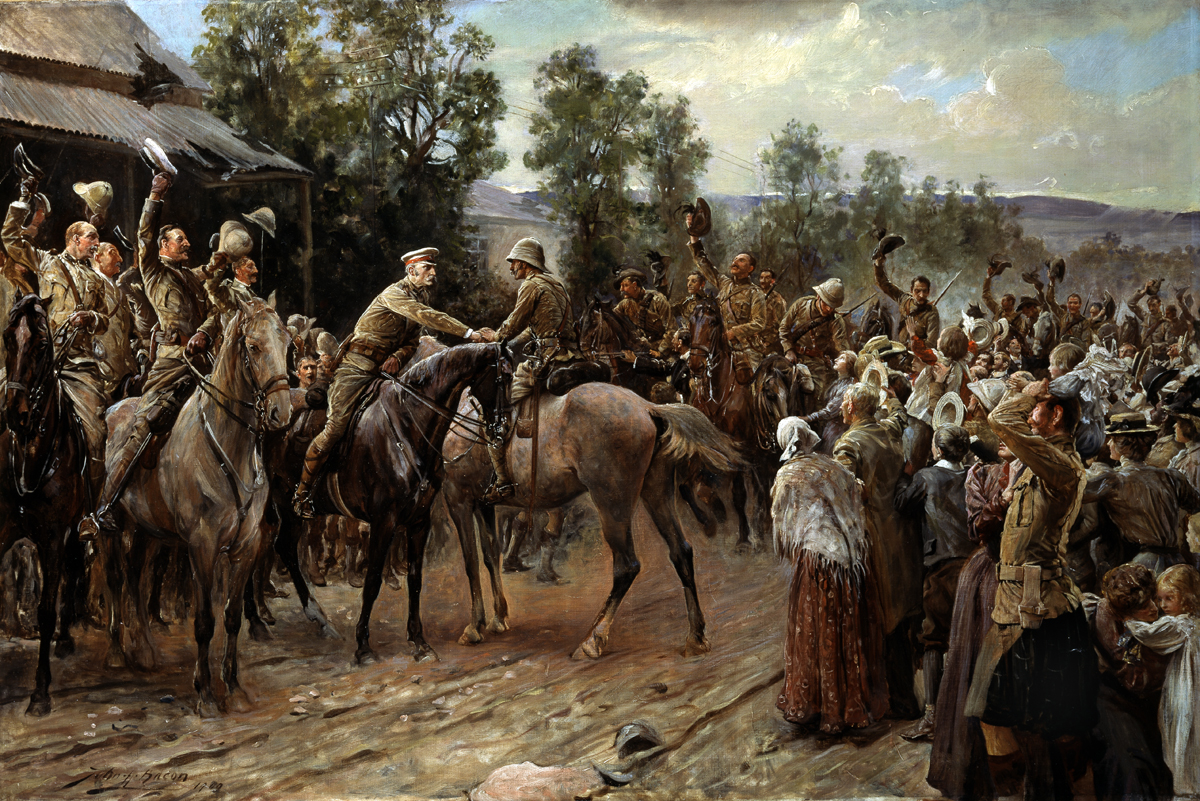
The Relief of Ladysmith. Sir George Stuart White greets Major Hubert Gough on 28 February. Painting by John Henry Frederick Bacon (1868–1914)

By May, the Australian contingents numbered over 3,000, and they were involved in the thick of the fighting, including the action at Driefontein, and the Relief of Mafeking on 17 May, which provoked wild celebrations on the streets of London. The third contingents from the Australian colonies had also begun to arrive in southern Africa. These were 'Imperial Bushmen' units, which were identical in composition, recruitment and structure as the preceding 'bushmen' units, except that they had been funded by the Imperial government in London as opposed to local subscription and donation. The British government had been so impressed by the performance of the Australian units that they had decided to fund the raising of additional units.

An outbreak of typhoid badly affected the British and Empire forces, but they were soon able to resume their campaign. Roberts' column was again halted briefly at Kroonstad due to problems with supplies, but after 10 days they continued the push towards Johannesburg. On 28 May The Orange Free State was formally annexed, and renamed as the Orange River Colony. By 30 May, Johannesburg had also fallen into the hands of Lord Roberts' force, and four days later the Boers were retreating from Pretoria. Men from all of the Australian units were in some way involved in the taking of Johannesburg. Pretoria, the capital of Transvaal Republic fell into British hands on 5 June. The first men into Pretoria, were the New South Wales Mounted Rifles, whose commander, Lt. William Watson persuaded the Boers to surrender the capital. Heavy fighting soon again broke out in the Battle of Diamond Hill on 11 and 12 June, fought to prevent the Boer reinforcements from recapturing Pretoria. Men from each of the Australian contingents, most notable the New South Wales, and Western Australian Mounted Rifles all took part in this battle, which was seen as a victory by both sides. Lord Roberts was pleased to have forced the Boers to retreat from Pretoria, but the forces of Louis Botha had inflicted heavy casualties on the British forces.

Orange Free State President Martinus Theunis Steyn, and President Paul Kruger of the South African Republic, had both retreated with surviving elements of their governments, into eastern Transvaal. Roberts was determined to capture the rebel presidents to end any opposition to British rule. He joined up with Buller's remaining forced from Natal, and advanced into the eastern Transvaal against them.

The British met a 5,000 strong Boer force under General Louis Botha at the Battle of Bergendal which lasted from 21 to 27 August, and would prove to be the last set-piece battle of the war. Despite fierce resistance, the Boers were overwhelmed by the 20,000 strong British force. The broken Boers retreated from the field, and the next day, 28 August, the British marched into Machadodorp, hoping to capture the Boer presidents. They had already left for Nelspruit, where the temporarily established their governments. With the British still in pursuit, Kruger and his former Transvaal government ministers were nearly cornered. However, the Queen of the Netherlands felt a high degree of sympathy towards the Boers, and offered Kruger a means of escape. Ignoring a Royal Navy blockade, 20-year-old Queen Wilhelmina of the Netherlands sent the Dutch warship De Gelderland to their rescue. Kruger escaped to live in exile in Switzerland, but died there in 1904.

The Battle of Bergendal had forced the Boers to abandon their hopes of achieving an outcome through direct, military confrontation of the enemy. But despite their defeats much of the Boer army remained intact, and Botha dispersed his men to Lydenburg and Barberton to begin a new phase of the conflict.

With all of the major population centres under British control, Roberts declared the war to be over on 3 September 1900, and formally annexed the South African Republic, declaring all formerly Boer territory to be under British control.

== Guerrilla warfare phases ==
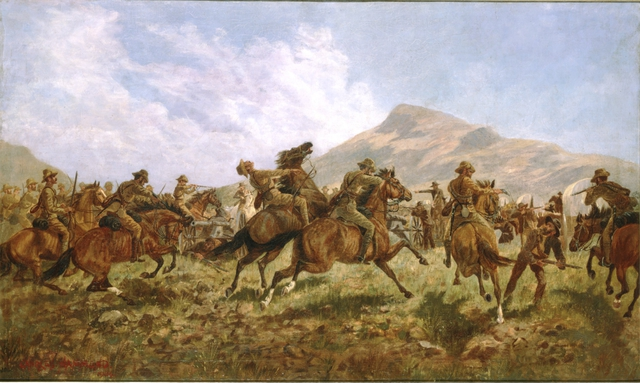
Australians and New Zealanders at Klerksdorp 24 March 1901 by Charles Hammond

The loss of the capitals did not deter the Boers. Instead, they moved their campaign into a phase of guerrilla warfare, in which Boer commandos operating in small groups, picked off men through sniping, disrupted troop movements and supply lines, and launched ambush attacks on individual or isolated units, or launched larger-scale raids against important targets.

Realising the campaign had been progressing well for the British, the Boer commanders had earlier met in secret in Kroonstad, and planned out their guerrilla campaign against British supply and communication lines. The first major attack of this new phase was the attack at Sanna's Post on 31 March 1900, in which Boer commander Christiaan de Wet led a force of 2,000 commandos from the former Orange Free State in a major attack on Bloemfontein's waterworks system 23 miles (37 km) east of the city. In the same attack they also ambushed a British convoy killing 155 British soldiers, and capturing seven guns, 117 wagons and 428 prisoners.

To sustain their guerrilla campaign, the Boers needed a regular supply of food, ammunition and equipment. In an effort to obtain such supplies, Koos de la Rey led a 3,000 strong Boer attack on the British post at Brakfontein on the Elands River in Western Transvaal on 4 August 1900. At the time, it was lightly defended by 300 Australians, comprising 105 New South Wales Citizens' Bushmen, 141 3rd Queensland Mounted Infantry, 2 Tasmanian Bushmen, 42 Victorian Bushmen, and 9 West Australian Bushmen, as well as an additional 201 Rhodesian Volunteers. De le Rey's force surrounded the outpost, but magnanimously offered to deliver the Australians to the nearest British position unharmed if they surrendered the supplies they were guarding. The commanding officer of the camp, Colonel Charles Hore, refused the offer. The Boers bombarded the Australian position with artillery fire. In two days they fired over 2,500 shells at the Elands River outpost. The defenders suffered 32 casualties, but continued to repulse any attempt to seize the outpost. The Boers turned back a relief force sent to assist the Australians, but were unable to take the position itself. After 11 days without success, and with the prospect of further reinforcements arriving, the Boers broke their siege and withdrew. The Australians and Rhodesians had successfully defended the Elands River outpost, and were eventually relieved on 16 August. The Boer commander, Koos de la Rey, was quoted as saying:

...For the first time in the war we are fighting men who used our own tactics against us. They were Australian volunteers and though small in number we could not take their position. They were the only troops who could scout our lines at night and kill our sentries while killing or capturing our scouts. Our men admitted that the Australians were more formidable opponents and far more dangerous than any other British troops.

—

In response to the Boers desperate need of supplies, the British command changed tactics, adopting a counter-insurgency approach. They established heavily defended blockhouses along supply-lines, and used a scorched earth policy, burning houses and crops, and interning Boers in concentration camps. This caused the costs of the campaign to rise dramatically, and began to have a negative impact on the popularity of the campaign amongst ordinary Australians. Some even started to feel sympathy for the Boers.

== Formation of the Commonwealth ==
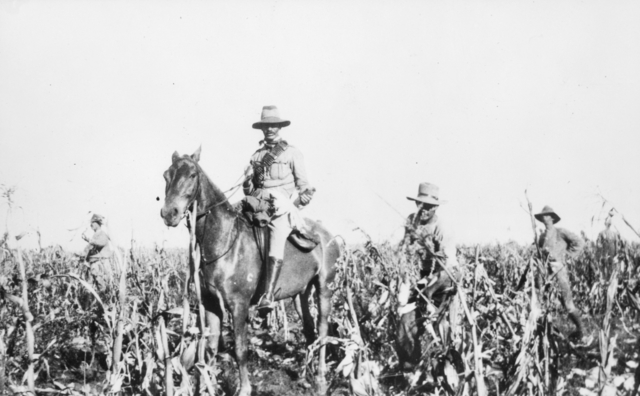
Troops of 1st Battalion, Australian Commonwealth Horse in the Transvaal 1902

The Commonwealth of Australia came into existence on 1 January 1901 as a result of the federation of the Australian colonies, and defence was made a responsibility of the new centralised, federal government. This brought about the creation of the Department of Defence, and two months later on 1 March 1901, the formation of the Australian Army.

All existing military units of each of the six colonies were transferred into the Australian Army, which at the time of formation consisted of 28,923 colonial soldiers, including 1,457 professional soldiers, 18,603 paid militia and 8,863 unpaid volunteers, including those on active service in South Africa. For practical reasons, and so as not to disrupt the ongoing war effort in South Africa, individual units continued to be administered under the various colonial Acts until the Defence Act 1903 brought all of the units under one piece of legislation.

In reality the only clear indication of the Australian men's new allegiance to the Commonwealth, was in the form of hat-badge changing ceremonies that took place in the field. The colonial troop's original badges of their home colony were replaced with Rising Sun Badges, the symbol of the newly formed Australian Army. It was also not practical or economical for the men to adopt a single uniform, or standardise equipment, and so each colonial unit continued to utilise their original uniforms and equipment.

After Federation in 1901, eight Australian Commonwealth Horse battalions of the newly created Australian Army were also sent to South Africa, although they saw little fighting before the war ended. Some Australians later joined local South African irregular units, instead of returning home after discharge. These soldiers were part of the British Army, and were subject to British military discipline. Such units included the Bushveldt Carbineers which gained notoriety as the unit in which Harry "Breaker" Morant and Peter Handcock served in before their - to this day controversial and contested legitimate - court martial under the British military code of the day, and their subsequent further controversial execution for what has been labelled the first war crimes tribunal by some historians.

== Closing stages ==
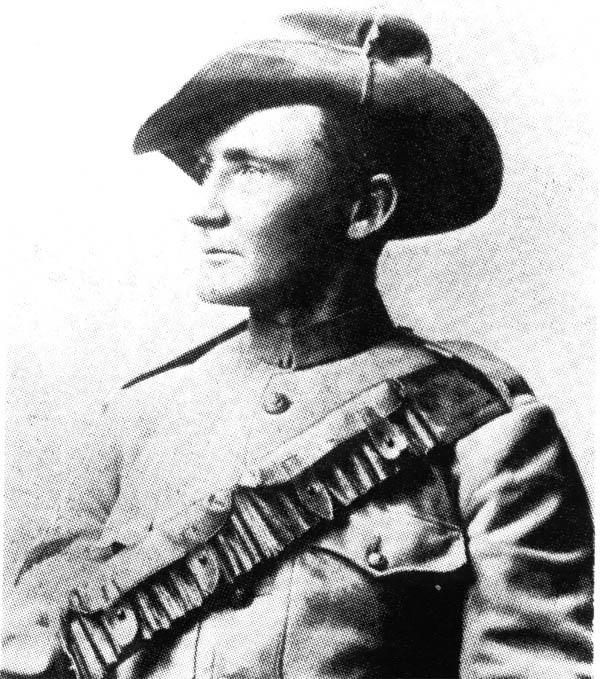
Harry 'Breaker' Harbord Morant, whose execution caused an increase in anti-war sentiment in Australia.

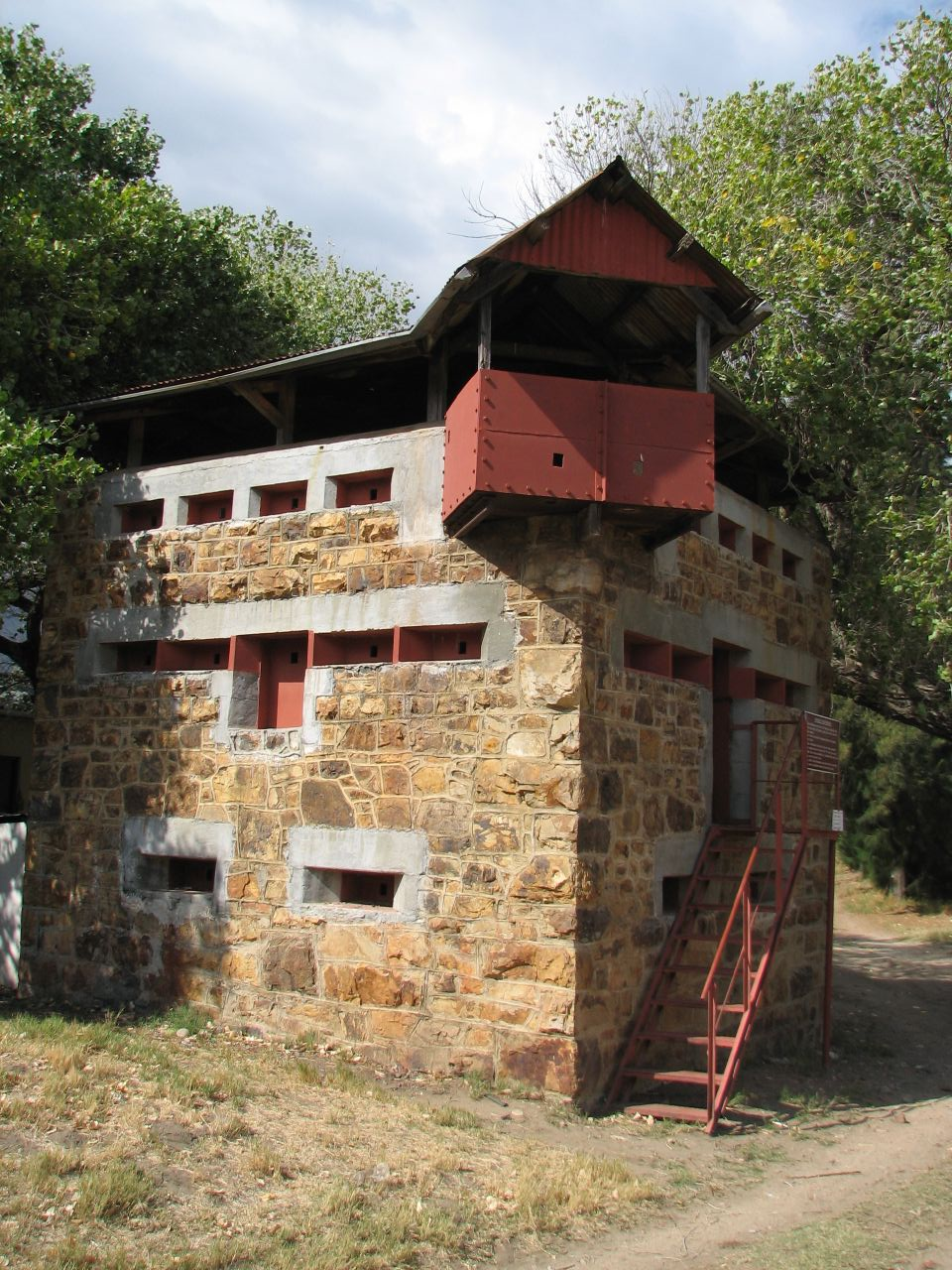
A surviving blockhouse in South Africa. Blockhouses were constructed by the British to secure supply routes from Boer raids during the war.

By the beginning of 1901, British forces were in control of almost all Boer territory, with the exception of some zones in northern Transvaal. While the Boers continued to conduct raids against British infrastructure and supply lines, their ability to disrupt British operations, or launch significant attacks had been totally reduced. Boers returned to their local districts in the hope that locals that knew them would offer sustenance and support. Although the Boers continued to hit back when they could, once the armies were dispersed their effectiveness diminished greatly. By mid-1901, the bulk of the fighting was over, and British mounted units would ride at night to attack Boer farmhouses or encampments, overwhelming them with superior numbers. Indicative of warfare in last months of 1901, the New South Wales Mounted Rifles traveled 1,814 miles (2,919 km) and were involved in thirteen skirmishes, killing 27 Boers, wounding 15, and capturing 196 for the loss of 5 dead and 19 wounded. Other notable Australian actions included Sunnyside, Slingersfontein, Pink Hill, Rhenosterkop and Haartebeestefontein.

By 1902, British and colonial forces were concentrating on denying remaining Boers the ability to move their forces across Southern Africa. The scorched-earth tactics implemented by Lord Kitchener were by this point beginning to starve the Boers into submission. The British began to utilise "sweeper columns", consisting of mounted infantry, which ranged across entire districts scouring them for Boer guerillas, suspected or otherwise.

The British policy of containment and dispersal had been highly effective, and by March 1902, all significant opposition from the Boers had ended. In March, the British offered peace terms, but these were rejected by Louis Botha. Suffering from disease and starvation, the last of the Boers surrendered in May, and on 31 May 1902, thirty delegates from the former South African Republic and Orange Free State met British officials in Vereeniging to discuss terms. Out of the negotiations Jan Smuts and Lord Kitchener produced the Treaty of Vereeniging (also known as the Peace of Vereeniging), in which the Boer republics agreed to end hostilities, surrender their independence, and swear allegiance to the crown. In exchange, a general amnesty would be granted, no death penalties would be administered, and Dutch and Afrikaans would be permitted in schools and courts.

Although a brief period of self-government as British dominions followed, Cape Colony, Colony of Natal, Orange River Colony, and Transvaal were soon abolished by the South Africa Act 1909, which created a new British dominion over the whole of southern Africa, known as the Union of South Africa.

== Conclusion ==
Troops from the Australian colonies were widely considered to be very effective on the British side, well able to match the Boers tactics of high mobility warfare due to similar upbringings and working lives.

Australians were not always successful however, suffering a number of heavy losses late in the war. On 12 June 1901, the 5th Victorian Mounted Rifles lost 19 killed and 42 wounded at Wilmansrust, near Middleburg after poor security allowed a force of 150 Boers to surprise them. Three of the Australians were subsequently court-martialled for inciting mutiny. On 30 October 1901, Victorians of the Scottish Horse Regiment also suffered heavy casualties at Gun Hill, although 60 Boers were also killed in the engagement. Meanwhile, at Onverwacht on 4 January 1902, the 5th Queensland Imperial Bushmen lost 13 killed and 17 wounded in the Battle of Onverwacht. Ultimately the Boers were defeated however, and the war ended on 31 May 1902.

In all 16,175 Australians served in South Africa, and perhaps another 10,000 enlisted as individuals in Imperial units; casualties included 251 killed in action, 267 died of disease and 43 missing in action, while a further 735 were wounded. The war had the third largest number of fatalities in Australia's military history, behind only the world wars.

The total number of men from the Australian colonies to have served in the Second Boer War is probably between 20,000 and 25,000, making it the second largest contingent behind British troops. Five Australians were awarded the Victoria Cross. These were Neville Howse of the New South Wales Army Medical Corps; Trooper John Hutton Bisdee of the Tasmanian Imperial Bushmen; Lieutenant Guy Wylly of the Tasmanian Imperial Bushmen; Lieutenant Frederick William Bell of the West Australian Mounted Infantry; and Lieutenant Leslie Cecil Maygar of the 5th Victorian Mounted Rifles.

== Australian units involved in the Boer War ==
KIA = 'Killed in action'
DFD = 'Died From Disease'

=== New South Wales ===
| Name | Type | Commander | Strength | Service period | Casualties | Notes |
|---|---|---|---|---|---|---|
| New South Wales Lancers | Cavalry | Capt CF Fox / Maj GL Lee | 112 (+58) | Nov 1899– 6 Dec 1900 | 2 KIA, 3 DFD | |
| New South Wales Army Medical Corps | Medical | Col WDC Williams | 86 | Dec 1899 – Dec 1900 | 2 DFD | Neville Howse awarded the VC |
| 'A' Squadron NSW Mounted Rifles | Mounted Infantry | Maj JM Antill | 104 | Dec 1899 – Dec 1900 | 3 KIA | |
| New South Wales Mounted Infantry (later "E"Sqn) | Mounted Infantry (+ 1 machine gun section) | Capt JG Legge | 126 | Dec 1899 – Dec 1900 | 7 KIA | |
| First Australian Horse | Cavalry | Lt WV Dowling / Cap RR Thompson / Capt JFM Wilkinson | 143 | Dec 1899 – Mar 1901 | 3 KIA, 7 DFD | |
| 'A' Bty. New South Wales Artillery | Artillery | Col SCU Smith / Maj EA Anthill | 175 (+44) / 6 guns | Feb 1900 – Aug 1901 | 1 KIA, 2 DFD | |
| First New South Wales Mounted Rifles | Mounted Infantry | Lt Col GC Knight | 405 | Feb 1900 – Mar 1901 | 10 KIA, 13 DFD | Absorbed A and E Sqns |
| New South Wales Citizens' Bushmen | Mounted Infantry | Lt Col HP Airey / Maj JF Thomas | 525 | Apr 1900 – Apr 1901 | 17 KIA, 13 DFD | |
| New South Wales Imperial Bushmen | Mounted Infantry | Col JAK Mackay / Lt Col H Le Mesurier | 762 | May 1900 – May 1901 | 13 KIA, 9 DFD | |
| Second New South Wales Mounted Rifles | Mounted Infantry (+ 1 machine gun section) | Lt Col HB Lassetter | 1050 | Apr 1901 – Apr 1902 | 30 KIA | |
| Third New South Wales Imperial Bushmen | Mounted Infantry | Lt-Col R Carrington | 1000 | May 1901 – May 1902 | 4 KIA, 18 DFD | |
| Third New South Wales Mounted Rifles | Mounted Infantry (+ 1 machine gun section) | Lt-Col C F Cox | 1017 | Apr 1901 – April 1902 | 7 KIA, 32 DFD | |
| Special Service Officers (NSW) | | | | | | |

=== Queensland ===
| Name | Type | Commander | Strength | Service period | Casualties | Notes |
|---|---|---|---|---|---|---|
| 1st Queensland Mounted Infantry | Mounted Infantry | Lt-Col PR Ricardo | 262 | Dec 1899 – Dec 1900 | 4 KIA, 5 DFD | |
| 2nd Queensland Mounted Infantry | Mounted Infantry | Lt-Col K Hutchison / Maj HG Chauvel | 144 | Mar 1900 – Mar 1901 | 0 | |
| Queensland Citizen Bushmen (later) 3rd Queensland Mounted Infantry / 2nd Bushmen Regiment | Mounted Infantry | Maj Walter Tunbridge | 316 | Apr 1900 – Apr 1901 | 3 KIA, 5 DFD | |
| Queensland Imperial Bushmen | Mounted Infantry | Lt-Col A Aytoun / Maj WT Deacon | 387 | Jun 1900 – Jun 1901 | 8 KIA, 5DFD | A khaki Christmas Card sent from Petoria from Bugler Leopold Baptiste Maries of the Fourth Queensland Contingent during the South African War. (8231563966) |
| 5th Queensland Imperial Bushmen | Mounted Infantry / Bicycle Infantry | Lt-Col JF Flewell-Smith / Maj FW Toll | 529 | Apr 1900 – Mar 1902 | 26 KIA, 4 DFD, 3 FF | Initially arrived with 3 mounted squadrons and 1 cyclist company |
| 6th Queensland Imperial Bushmen | Mounted Infantry | Lt-Col OA Tunbridge | 404 | May 1901 – Apr 1902 | 7 KIA, 5 DFD | |
| 7th Queensland Imperial Bushmen | Mounted Infantry | Cap RB Echlin / Lt AD Chrichton | 99 | Oct 1900 – Apr 1900 | 2 KIA, | 7th Contingent was in fact drafts for 5th and 6th Contingents |
| Special Service Officers (Queensland) | | | | | | |

=== South Australia ===
| Name | Type | Commander | Strength | Service period | Casualties | Notes |
|---|---|---|---|---|---|---|
| 1st South Australian Mounted Rifles | Mounted Infantry | Maj FH Howland | 127 | Nov 1899 – Oct 1900 | 2 KIA, 3 DFD | |
| 2nd South Australian Mounted Rifles | Mounted Infantry | Maj CJ Reade | 119 | Mar 1900 – Mar 1901 | 0 KIA, 4 DFD | |
| South Australian Nurses | Nurses | Sis MS Bismead | 9 | Mar 1900 – Mar 1902 | 0 | |
| South Australian Citizens' Bushmen | Mounted Infantry | Cap SG Hubbe† / Cap AE Collins | 99 | Apr 1900 – Apr 1901 | 3 KIA, 0 DFD | |
| South Australian Imperial Bushmen | Mounted Infantry | Lt-Col J Rowell | 234 | Jun 1900 – Jun 1901 | 6 KIA, 3 DFD | |
| 5th South Australian Imperial Bushmen | Mounted Infantry | Maj W Scriven / Maj HLD Wilson | 316 | Mar 1901 – Mar 1902 | 9 KIA, 10 DFD | Amalgamated with 6th SA Imperial Bushmen in May 1901 under Maj JSM Shea |
| 6th South Australian Imperial Bushmen | Mounted Infantry | Cap AF Cornish / Maj FW Hurcombe | 136 | May 1901 – Mar 1902 | 3 KIA, 3 DFD | Amalgamated with 5th SA Imperial Bushmen in May 1901 under Maj JSM Shea |
| Special Service Officers (South Australia) | | | | | | |

=== Tasmania ===
| Name | Type | Commander | Strength | Service period | Casualties | Notes |
|---|---|---|---|---|---|---|
| Tasmanian Mounted Infantry | Mounted Infantry | Maj Cyril Cameron | 84 (+47) | Nov 1899 – Nov 1900 | 4 KIA, 5 DFD | |
| Tasmanian Citizen Bushmen | Mounted Infantry | Lt-Col ET Wallack / Cap AH Rigall / Lt WH Lowther | 52 | Apr 1900 – Apr 1901 | 1 KIA, 0 DFD | |
| 1st Tasmanian Imperial Bushmen | Mounted Infantry | Maj RC Lewis / Cap AA Sale / Maj RC Lewis | 122 | Jun 1900 – Jun 1901 | 4 KIA, 2 DFD | Trooper John Hutton Bisdee, and Lieutenant Guy Wylly both awarded VC |
| 2nd Tasmanian Imperial Bushmen | Mounted Infantry | Lt-Col ET Watchorn | 253 | May 1901 – May 1902 | 2 KIA, 4DFD | |
| Special Service Officers (Tasmania) | | | | | | |

=== Victoria ===
| Name | Type | Commander | Strength | Service period | Casualties | Notes |
|---|---|---|---|---|---|---|
| 1st Victorian Mounted Rifles | Mounted Infantry | Maj GA Eady / Maj D McLeish / Col T Price | 250 | Nov 1899 – Oct 1900 | 9 KIA, 7 DFD | |
| 2nd Victorian Mounted Rifles | Mounted Infantry | Col T Price | 265 | Feb 1900 – Dec 1900 | 2 KIA, 7 DFD | |
| Victorian Citizen Bushmen | Mounted Infantry | Maj WW Dobbin | 251 | Apr 1900 – Apr 1901 | 8 KIA, 7 DFD | |
| Victorian Nurses | Nurses | Sis M Rawson | 10 | Apr 1900 – Mar 1901 | 1 DFD | |
| Victorian Imperial Bushmen (Australian Imperial Regiment) | Mounted Infantry | Lt W Kelly | 631 | May 1900 – Jun 1901 | 8 KIA, 6 DFD | |
| 5th Victorian Mounted Rifles | Mounted Infantry | Col AE Otter / Maj W McKnight / Maj TF Umphelby | 1018 | Mar 1901 – Mar 1902 | 36 KIA, 13 DFD | Lt Leslie Maygar awarded VC |
| Recruits for Scottish Horse | Mounted Infantry | | | | | |
| Special Service Officers (Victoria) | | | | | | |

=== Western Australia ===
| Name | Type | Commander | Strength | Service period | Casualties | Notes |
|---|---|---|---|---|---|---|
| 1st Western Australian Mounted Infantry | Mounted Infantry | Maj HG Moor† / Cap FMW Parker | 130 | Nov 1899 – Oct 1900 | 5 KIA, 1 DFD | |
| 2nd Western Australian Mounted Infantry | Mounted Infantry | Maj HL Pilkington | 103 | Mar – Nov 1900 | 0 | |
| Western Australian Citizen Bushmen' | Mounted Infantry | Maj HG Vialls | 116 | Apr 1900 – Apr 1901 | 2 KIA, 2 DFD | |
| Western Australian Nurses | Nurses | Sup MA Nicolay | 11 | Apr 1900–1901 | 0 | |
| 4th Western Australian Mounted Infantry (Imperial Bushmen) | Mounted Infantry | Maj J Rose | 132 | Jun 1900 – Jun 1901 | 3 KIA, 0 DFD | |
| 5th Western Australian Mounted Infantry | Mounted Infantry | Cap HF Darling | 221 | Apr 1901 – Apr 1902 | 6 KIA, 3 DFD | |
| 6th Western Australian Mounted Infantry | Mounted Infantry | Cap J Campbell | 228 | May 1901 – Apr 1902 | 10 KIA, 4 DFD | Lieutenant Frederick William Bell awarded the VC |

=== Commonwealth of Australia ===
| Name | Type | Commander | Strength | Service period | Casualties | Notes |
|---|---|---|---|---|---|---|
| 1st Australian Commonwealth Horse | Mounted Infantry | Lt-Col JS Lyster (QLD) | 560 | Mar–May 1902 | 0 KIA, 8 DFD | 4 & ½ mounted rifle sqns (3 NSW, 1 QLD, ½ TAS) |
| 2nd Australian Commonwealth Horse | Mounted Infantry | Lt-Col D McLeish (VIC) | 553 | Mar–May 1902 | 0 KIA, 1 DFD | 4 & ½ mounted rifle sqns (3 VIC, 1 SA, ½ WA) |
| Commonwealth Army Medical Corps | Medical | Maj TA Green (NSW)/Maj NR Howse (NSW) | 183 | Mar – May 1902 | 0 | recruited from NSW, QLD, SA, VIC, WA |
| 3rd Australian Commonwealth Horse | Mounted Infantry | Lt-Col ET Wallack (TAS) / Lt-Col Wallace (VIC) | 615 | Apr 1902 | 0 KIA, 9 DFD | 5 mounted rifle sqns (3 NSW, 1 QLD, 1 TAS); did not see action |
| 4th Australian Commonwealth Horse | Mounted Infantry | Lt-Col GJ Johnstone (VIC) | 492 | Mar – Apr 1902 | 0 KIA, 2 DFD | 5 mounted rifle sqns (3 VIC, 1 SA, 1 WA); did not see action |
| 5th Australian Commonwealth Horse | Mounted Infantry | Lt-Col JW Macarthur-Onslow (NSW) | 487 | – | 0 | 4 mounted rifle sqns (all NSW); arrived after war ended |
| 6th Australian Commonwealth Horse | Mounted Infantry | Lt-Col GCH Irving (VIC) | 489 | – | 0 KIA, 4 DFD | 4 mounted rifle sqns (all VIC); arrived after war ended |
| 7th Australian Commonwealth Horse | Mounted Infantry | Lt-Col HG Chauvel (QLD) | 490 | – | 0 KIA, 4 DFD | 4 mounted rifle sqns, (all QLD); arrived after war ended |
| 8th Australian Commonwealth Horse | Mounted Infantry | Lt-Col H Le Mesurier (NSW) | 485 | – | 0 KIA, 3 DFD | 4 mounted rifle sqns (2 SA, 1 WA, 1 TAS); arrived after war ended |

Australians also fought in the following units which were either privately raised or were raised in South Africa, but were not official units of the Australian colonies, or of the Commonwealth of Australia:

- Australian Regiment
- Australian Mounted Infantry Brigade
- Australian Commonwealth Regiment
- Bushveldt Carbineers
- Canadian Scouts
- 3rd Bushmen Regiment
- 4th Imperial Bushmen
- Composite Bushmen Regiment
- Cameron's Scouts
- Doyle's Australian Scouts
- Hasler's Scouts

== Timeline of the Australian contribution to the Second Boer War ==
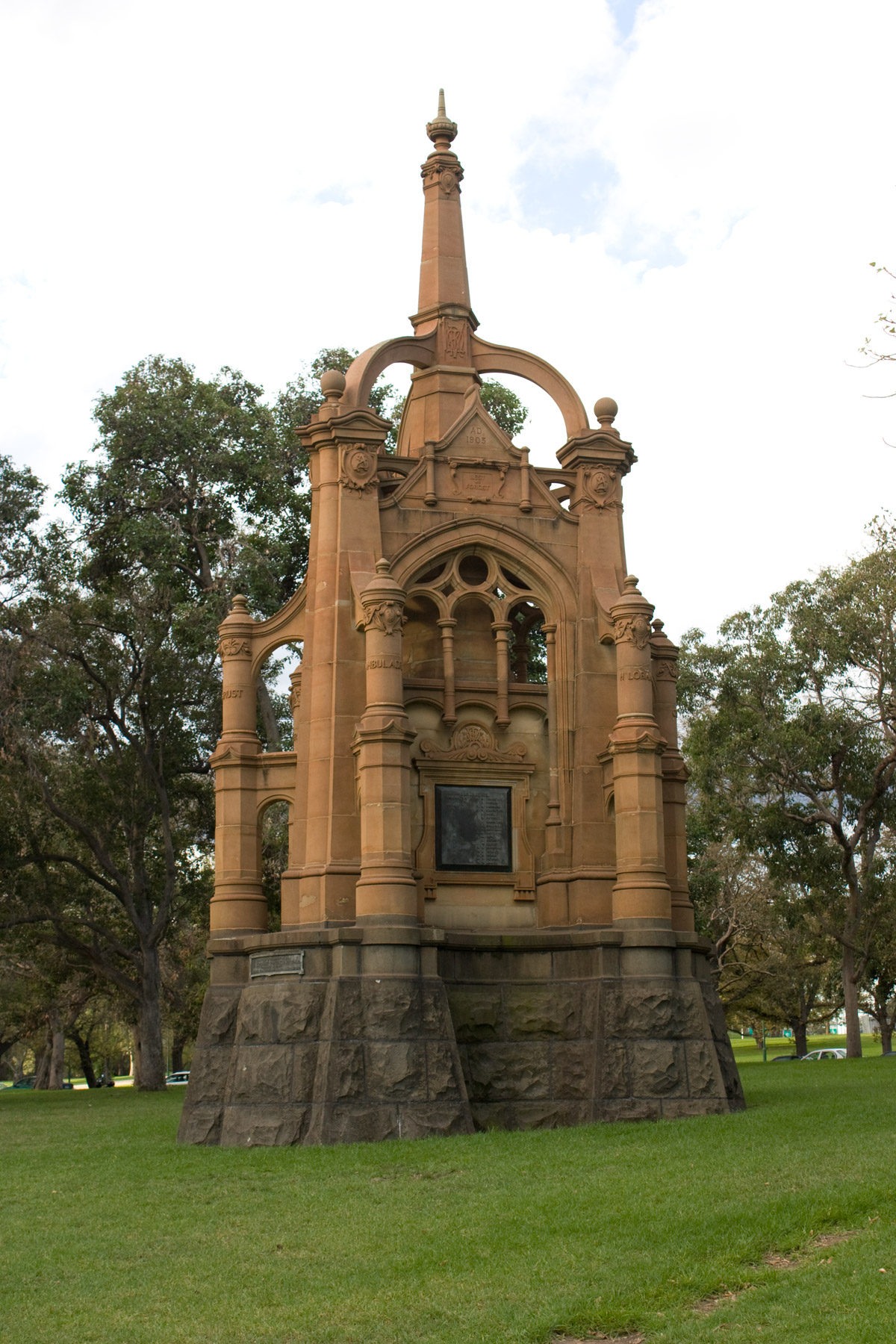
Memorial erected by the 5th Victorian Mounted Rifles Regiment in 1908 in the Kings Domain, Melbourne, in honour of those whose lives were lost.

| 1899 | 2 November – First Australians Arrive in South Africa; 19 November – Belmont / Modder River |
| 1900 | 1 January – Sunnyside; 11 February – Kimberley; 3 May – Bloemfontein; 5 May – Coetzee's Drift; 16 May – Mafeking; 28 May – Johannesberg; 1 June – Pretoria; 12 June – Diamond Hill; 4 August – Elands River |
| 1901 | 29 March – Rhenosterkop; 8 April – Pietersburg; 15 April – Middleberg; 12 June – Wilmansrust Incident; 16 September – Spelonken Incident |
| 1902 | 1 April – Newcastle; 19 April – Klerksdorp; 7 May – Vryburg; August – Last contingents sail for Australia |

== See also ==
- Military history of Australia
- Australian Army battle honours of the Second Boer War
