= Harold Elliott (Australian Army officer) =

Australian politician

Major General Harold Edward Elliott CB, CMG, DSO, DCM, VD
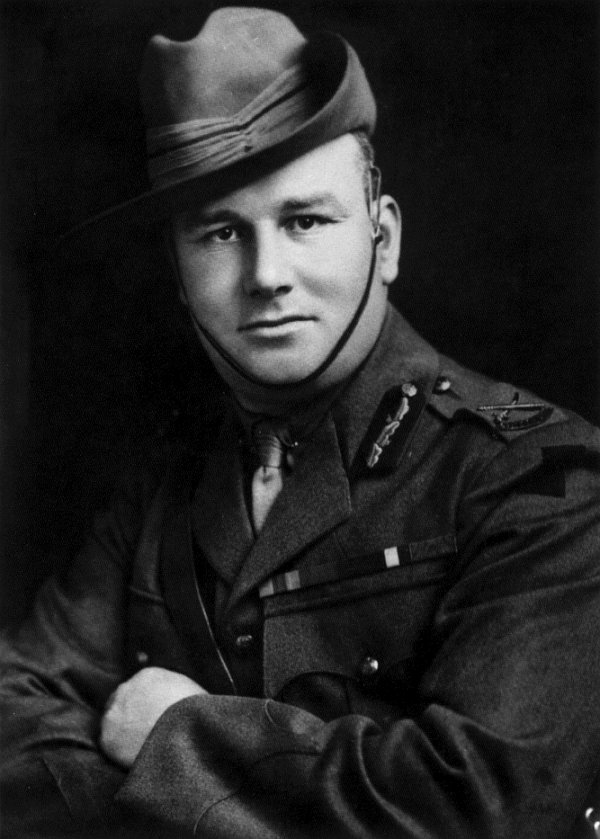
- Brigadier General Harold Elliott
- Born: 19 June 1878; West Charlton, Victoria
- Died: 23 March 1931 (aged 52); Malvern, Victoria
- Burial place: Burwood Cemetery, Burwood, Victoria
- Relatives: George Elliott (brother)
- Military career
- Allegiance: Australia
- Branch: Australian Army
- Service years: 1899–1931
- Rank: Major General
- Nickname: Pompey
- Commands: 3rd Division (1927–31); 15th Brigade (1916–21, 1926–27); 7th Battalion (1914–16); 58th Battalion (Essendon Rifles) (1913–14)
- Conflicts: Second Boer War; First World War; Gallipoli campaign; Landing at Anzac; Battle of Lone Pine; Western Front; Battle of Fromelles; Second Battle of Bullecourt; Battle of Polygon Wood; Second Battle of Villers-Bretonneux; Battle of Amiens; Battle of the Hindenburg Line
- Awards: Companion of the Order of the Bath; Companion of the Order of St Michael and St George; Distinguished Service Order; Distinguished Conduct Medal; Volunteer Decoration; Mentioned in Despatches (8); Order of St. Anna (Russia); Croix de guerre (France)
- Other work: Solicitor at Law; Senator for Victoria; Board member Royal Melbourne Hospital

Major General Harold Edward "Pompey" Elliott (19 June 1878 – 23 March 1931) was a senior officer in the Australian Army during the First World War. After the war he served as a Senator for Victoria in the Australian parliament.

Elliott entered the University of Melbourne as a resident at Ormond College in 1898 to study law, but left in 1900 to serve in the Imperial Bushmen in the South African War. He was awarded the Distinguished Conduct Medal, and given a British Army commission, but chose to remain with the Victorian Imperial Bushmen as an attached subaltern. He returned to Australia in 1901, but went back to South Africa to serve with the Border Scouts, who patrolled remote and inhospitable areas. In December 1901, he distinguished himself in repelling a numerically superior Boer force, and received a congratulatory telegram from General Lord Kitchener. After he returned to Australia, he completed his law degree and became a solicitor. He was commissioned as a second lieutenant in the Militia in 1904, and he was promoted to lieutenant in 1905, captain in 1909, major in 1911, and lieutenant colonel in 1913, commanding the 58th Battalion (Essendon Rifles).

After the outbreak of the First World War, Elliott joined the Australian Imperial Force (AIF), and formed and commanded the 7th Infantry Battalion, which he led in the landing at Anzac on 25 April 1915, and the Battle of Lone Pine in August. In March 1916, he became the commander of the newly formed 15th Infantry Brigade, which he led in the disastrous Battle of Fromelles in July 1916. In March 1917, the German retreat to the Hindenburg Line gave Elliott a rare chance to display his tactical acumen in an independent command as the 15th Brigade operated as an advance guard of the British Fifth Army. It fought in the Second Battle of Bullecourt in May 1917, and the Battle of Polygon Wood at the end of September 1917, when Elliott's leadership transformed a near-defeat into a victory. In the Second Battle of Villers-Bretonneux in April 1918, he won another famous victory.

Elliott won the 1919 federal election as a Nationalist Party of Australia candidate for the Senate, and was re-elected in the 1925 election. His involvement with returned servicemen's issues led to his redrafting of the constitution of the Returned Sailors and Soldiers Imperial League of Australia, and he played an important part in the Victoria Police strike, making a call alongside Lieutenant General Sir John Monash for members of the AIF to come to Melbourne Town Hall and sign up as special constables. In 1926, he was appointed to command the 15th Brigade again, and the following year was finally promoted to the rank of major general, and became the commander of the 3rd Division. Suffering from chronic post-traumatic stress disorder, he killed himself in March 1931.

== Early life ==
Harold Edward Elliott was born 19 June 1878 in West Charlton, Victoria, the third son and fifth child of eight children of a farmer and prospector, Thomas Elliott, and his wife Helen, née Janvrin. His mother was born in Jersey.

Elliott was nicknamed "Harkey" by his family. He grew up on the family farms, and attended the local school, known as the Rock Tank. In 1894, his father was one of six men who made a sensational find on the goldfields at Coolgardie, Western Australia. They sold their claim to the Earl of Fingall for £180,000 and a sixth interest. Fingall then floated it in London as a company valued at £700,000. This changed the family's circumstances. Debts were paid, and the farms acquired outright. The family moved to a new house named "Elsinore" near Lake Wendouree in Ballarat, Victoria. In January 1895, Elliott commenced at Ballarat College, a private Presbyterian boys' school, where one of the school houses, "Elliott", is now named after him. Despite concerns about the adequacy of his Rock Tank education, Elliott topped his class in Latin, bookkeeping, and Bible studies in his first year. He topped the class in seven of his eight subjects in 1896, and went on to become dux of the school in 1897.

Elliott entered Ormond College, the Presbyterian hall of residence at the University of Melbourne in 1898 to study law. Between 1883 and 1896, law students had been required to first obtain a Bachelor of Arts degree before going on to study law. This had been changed, but Elliott, who was under no financial pressure to complete his degree quickly, elected to follow the old route and complete an arts degree first. He also represented Ormond College in football and athletics, and joined the University Officers' Training Corps. In March 1900, the Imperial authorities asked the Australian colonial governments to raise a force of 2,500 Imperial Bushmen for service in the South African War. Elliott decided to interrupt his studies to serve, and was one of 4,000 applicants for the 626 positions allotted to Victoria. He was accepted for the Victorian Imperial Bushmen, and trained at Langwarrin, Victoria, before embarking for South Africa on 1 May 1900.

== Boer War service ==
The Victorian Imperial Bushmen were initially based at Marandellas in case the Boers invaded Southern Rhodesia. In January 1901 they moved to the Cape Colony, where they were attached to a Coldstream Guards force under the command of Lieutenant Colonel Arthur Henniker. This sometimes formed part of a larger force under the command of Colonel Herbert Plumer. On 28 February 1901, a 16-man detachment of Victorian Imperial Bushmen under the command of Captain Joseph Dallimore tracked a party of Boers. During the night, Elliott, now a corporal, stole the Boers' 54 horses without waking them. At dawn the bushmen surrounded and attacked the Boer party's encampment, and compelled all 33 of them to surrender. For his part, Elliott was awarded the Distinguished Conduct Medal, the British Empire's second-highest award for gallantry by other ranks after the Victoria Cross, and mentioned in despatches. He was given a British Army commission as a lieutenant in the 2nd Battalion, Royal Berkshire Regiment on 20 November 1900, but he remained with the Victorian Imperial Bushmen as an attached subaltern. He embarked for Australia on 22 June 1901, reaching Melbourne on 12 July. His British Army commission was cancelled at his own request.

On 24 August 1901, he sailed for South Africa again on the SS Britannic. There, he obtained a commission as a lieutenant in the Cape Colony Cyclist Corps on 18 October 1901. He then joined the Border Scouts, who patrolled remote and inhospitable areas. In December 1901, he distinguished himself in repelling a numerically superior Boer force under Commandant Edwin Alfred Conroy. For this he received a congratulatory telegram from General Lord Kitchener that read: "Please tell Lieut. Elliott that I am very pleased with his conduct and that of his men in driving off Conroy and saving horses." The war ended in May 1902, but Elliott remained with the Border Scouts until they were disbanded in September. In addition to his Distinguished Conduct Medal, Elliott was awarded the Queen's South Africa Medal with four clasps (Rhodesia, Orange Free State, Transvaal, and Cape Colony), and the King's South Africa Medal with two clasps (South Africa 1901 and South Africa 1902).

== Early law career ==
In 1903, Elliott returned to his studies, completing his arts degree. Instead of staying at Ormond College, he lived at "Endersleigh", a residence in Drummond Street, Carlton, owned by Alexander and Mary Campbell. The following year he commenced law, winning a residential scholarship to Ormond College. He was also commissioned in the Militia as a second lieutenant in the 5th Infantry Regiment. He returned to Ormond in 1905, where he was joined by his brother George, who had also been dux of Ballarat College, and went on to play football for Fitzroy and University in the Victorian Football League. Elliott graduated in 1906 with his Bachelor of Arts and Bachelor of Laws with second class honours, sharing the Supreme Court Prize for the top law student.

A law degree was not sufficient to allow one to practise law; aspiring lawyers had also to complete articles. Elliott joined the firm of Moule, Hamilton and Kiddle on Market Street. While working on his articles, he lived at Endersleigh and courted Belle and Kate, the daughters of its owners. He completed his articles in August 1907, and was dismissed by Moule, Hamilton and Kiddle, since the firm would now have to pay him a living wage. Elliott practised as a solicitor in Stawell, Victoria, for a while, before returning to Melbourne, where he formed a partnership with a fellow solicitor, Glen Roberts, with offices in Collins Street. He bought a house called "Dalriada" in Northcote, with a loan from his father, and married Kate Campbell there on 27 December 1909. They had two children, a daughter, Violet, born in March 1911, and a son, Neil, in June 1912. His militia career also flourished, and he was promoted to lieutenant in 1905, captain in 1909, major in 1911, and lieutenant colonel in 1913, commanding the 58th Battalion (Essendon Rifles).

== First World War ==
=== Gallipoli Campaign ===
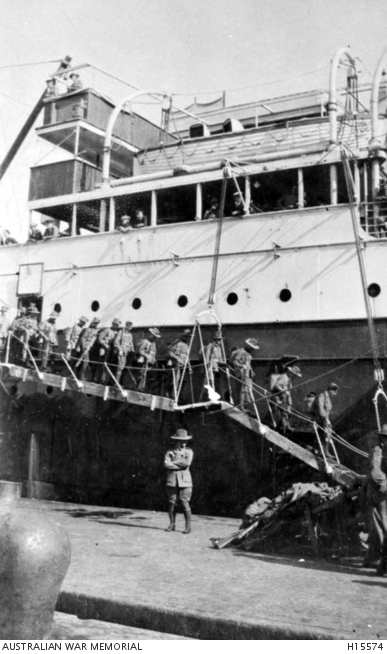
The 7th Battalion disembarking in Egypt

On 14 August 1914, soon after the First World War began, Elliott was given the same rank in the Australian Imperial Force (AIF), and command of the 7th Infantry Battalion, one of four Victorian battalions in Colonel James Whiteside McCay's 2nd Infantry Brigade. Elliott's first action was to ask Major Walter McNicoll to be his second in command, a position McNicoll readily accepted. He then supervised the raising of his battalion. Three of his eight companies were drawn from the northern suburbs of Melbourne, but the other five came mainly from central Victoria. He took particular care over the selection of officers. The newly formed battalion marched from Victoria Barracks to the training camp at Broadmeadows, Victoria, on 19 August. Elliott believed that Australians would take readily to military discipline if the reasons for it were properly explained. McCay was disturbed at the numbers of men without prior militia training that were being enlisted, but some of the battalion's recruiting area had no militia units. Instead, Elliott relied on the quality of the militia's officers and non-commissioned officers to produce well-trained soldiers.

On 18 October, the 7th Battalion entrained for Port Melbourne, where it boarded the SS Hororata for England. While it was en route, the destination was changed to Egypt. In Egypt, the battalion was re-organised, changing over to the new establishment of four companies instead of eight, and McNicoll left to take over command of the 6th Infantry Battalion. Elliott established a mystique as a larger than life personality, and his idiosyncrasies drew intense devotion and loyalty from his men. He acquired the nickname "Pompey" after the famous football player Fred "Pompey" Elliott, who played 209 games for Carlton and Melbourne. Throughout the war, he was accompanied by a black charger, called "Darkie", who (with subtle encouragement) would spot the smallest irregularities in the men. Years later, his men were still convinced that it was the horse who had noticed the errors their commander had berated them for.

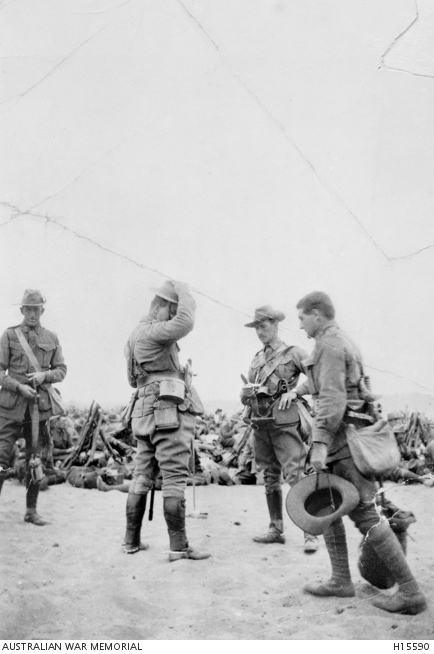
Elliott (second from left) and McNicoll (third from left) taking a rest during training in the desert.

For the landing at Anzac on 25 April 1915, the 6th and 7th Battalions travelled from Lemnos in the SS Galeka. The plan called for the troops to be landed by tows—wooden rowboats towed by a powered craft; but when the ship came under fire with no sign of the tows that were to take the troops ashore, the ship's master decided that the 7th Battalion must proceed ashore in the ship's rowboats. Elliott was strongly opposed to this, as the men would have to row a long way, and the battalion would become disorganised from the start, but had to give way. Elliott went in the fifth boat. When his boat and the one following were about 400 yards (370 m) from shore, they were met by a steam pinnace, which towed them to Anzac Cove, where Elliott stepped ashore about 0530. The plan called for the 2nd Brigade to advance on the left towards Hill 971, but Colonel Ewen Sinclair-Maclagan told him that the plan needed to be changed, and that the 2nd Brigade was required on the right, around the 400 Plateau. Climbing up to the 400 Plateau to view the situation for himself, Elliott was wounded in the ankle. He was helped down to the beach, where he remained for several hours, insisting that others were more severely wounded than himself. Eventually, he was taken to the hospital ship HMHS Gascon, and thence back to Alexandria.

Elliott was admitted to the 1st Australian General Hospital in Heliopolis on 7 May 1915, was discharged on 26 May, and rejoined the 7th Battalion at Anzac on 5 June. On 8 July he was in his headquarters behind Steele's Post when he received word that the Turks were in an Australian tunnel near the German Officers' Trench. Characteristically, he went forward in person to ascertain the situation, entering the tunnel with two men. Some 20 feet (6.1 m) from the end there was a flash in his face, and the man behind him was shot. Elliott drew his pistol and barricaded the tunnel with sand bags, refusing help for fear that anyone else coming forward might also be hit. The tunnel was blocked off, and sealed with an explosion. On 8 August 1915, the 7th Battalion moved into positions captured the previous day in the Battle of Lone Pine, and he took over responsibility for the defence of the entire position. He led his men from the front trenches, steadying them in an uncertain situation. They fought off a series of Turkish counterattacks, winning four Victoria Crosses in the process. In the fighting, a man next to him was shot dead, splashing him from head to foot with blood and brains, but he was not decorated for the battle despite inspirational leadership. Apparently his name, originally at the top of the recommendations for decorations, had been struck off the list. On 28 August, Elliott was evacuated to England towards the end of August with pleurisy, and did not rejoin the 7th Battalion until 7 November. On 18 December, one day before the evacuation of Anzac, he sprained his ankle and was evacuated ahead of his troops. He was mentioned in despatches on 28 January 1916.

=== Suez Canal ===
After the evacuation, the 7th Battalion was returned to Egypt, where Elliott rejoined it on 15 January. On 15 February, he was appointed to command, with the rank of brigadier general, the 1st Infantry Brigade, vice Brigadier General Nevill Smyth, who was being promoted. Two weeks later the news came that Smyth would not be promoted after all, so Elliott asked to be returned to the 7th Battalion. When the commander of the AIF, Lieutenant General Sir William Birdwood, offered Elliott the newly formed 14th Infantry Brigade in Maj. Gen. James Whiteside M’Cay's new 5th Division instead, Elliott said that he would prefer the 15th Infantry Brigade, as it was the Victorian brigade of the 5th Division, whereas the 14th was from New South Wales. Birdwood granted this request. Elliott soon made himself unpopular with Birdwood when he wanted to replace three of the four battalion commanders allotted to him. He was told that their reputations were sacred, but Elliott replied that the lives of his men were more so. Birdwood forced him to accept them for the time being; but Elliott eventually had his way. He also reorganised the brigade to match that of the Militia brigade of the same number at home.

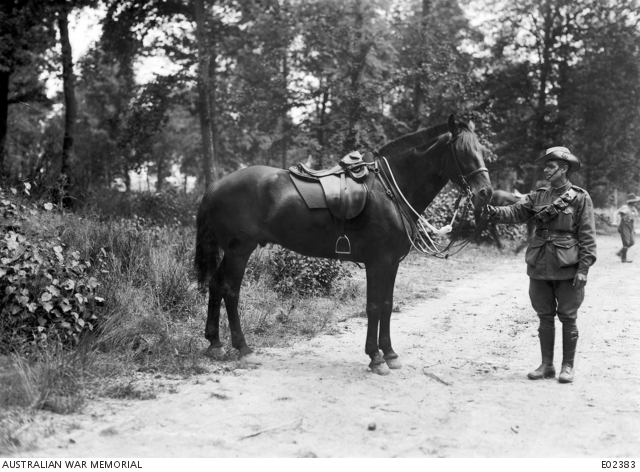
Elliott's horse Darkie. The men of the 15th Brigade credited this charger with the ability to notice and point out to Elliott any man who had not shaved or was not dressed properly. The charger was a well trained stock horse and the slightest pressure on his shoulder would cause him to stop.

In March 1916, the 5th Division was sent 35 miles (56 km) across the desert to defend the Suez Canal. The crossing was first attempted by the 14th Brigade, who suffered badly. Elliott personally inspected the route, talked with officers familiar with it, and drew up a new timetable for the march, managing to get his men across with only a handful of casualties. On the march, one man forgot the ban on smoking. Elliott characteristically started to scream at the man, even threatening to shoot him. Out from the ranks came a shout: "If you shoot him, I'll shoot you." When the soldier who called out was brought forward and explained that no one talked to his brother like that, Elliott sent the man to his school for non-commissioned officers, with the rationale that anyone who could stand up to himself in full flight clearly had leadership potential.

On arriving at Suez, the water that the battalion had been promised was nowhere to be found. They were assured that the water was coming, but hours later it still had not appeared. Elliott then made one of the "vigorous protests" that he was becoming famous for. He even threatened to march them back across the Suez Canal to get them a drink. "It was outrageous to deprive men of water in the desert" Elliott thundered. He was assured that the water would be available at 5.30 the next morning. Elliott was up at 0500, and found many of his men had been unable to sleep due to their thirst, and were licking at the taps around camp. He found the camp's chief engineer, who informed him that the Egyptian civil authorities had not provided enough water for the troops in camp, and that he had strict orders not to start the pumps before 0800, as it would wake the II Anzac Corps commander, Lieutenant General Sir Alexander Godley. Elliott remounted his horse and went to II Anzac Corps Headquarters, where he informed a yawning staff officer in silk pyjamas that unless the water was turned on in the next five minutes, the brigade would be assembling and telling the corps commander exactly what they thought of him. The staff officer made a phone call, and Elliott was warned that he should not make such a fuss again. He simply replied that he would do whatever was needed to help his men whenever he had to.

=== Western Front ===
The 15th Brigade embarked for the Western Front on 17 June 1916. Its first battle was the disastrous Battle of Fromelles. Despite his inexperience in trench warfare, he pointed out to Major H. C. L. Howard of Field Marshal Sir Douglas Haig's British Expeditionary Force staff that no-man's land was too wide for the battle plan to have any chance of success. Major Howard agreed and, on returning to Haig's Chateau, attempted to persuade him that the attack was doomed to fail. After the commander in chief decided that the operation would proceed regardless, Elliott went to the front line to personally inspect the lie of the land and encourage his men. He realised that the attack had failed and that he was now defending the original trenches. In the end, 1,804 of the 5,533 Australian casualties were from the 15th Brigade. For his part, Elliott was made a Companion of the Order of St Michael and St George, mentioned in despatches, and awarded the Russian Order of St Anna (3rd class, with swords).

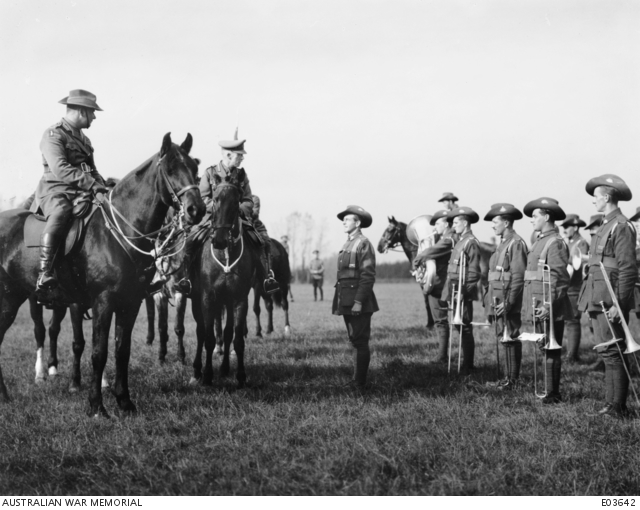
Major General Sir Talbot Hobbs, General Officer Commanding the 5th Division, inspecting the 59th and 60th Battalion Bands with Elliott (left)

These losses precluded the 5th Division's further involvement in the fighting in the Battle of the Somme. It was not sent south to join the other division of I Anzac Corps until October. Ordered to make an attack north of Flers that he didn't believe would succeed, he refused. In March 1917, the Germans retreated to the Hindenburg Line, giving Elliott a rare chance to display his tactical acumen in an independent command as his brigade operated as an advance guard of the British Fifth Army. He was mentioned in despatches, and made a Companion of the Distinguished Service Order. His citation read:

For conspicuous gallantry when in command of the advanced guards of the division during an advance. The successes during a long period of almost continuous fighting, the capture of several villages, which were held against frequent and violent counter-attacks, and the slightness of our losses compared to those of the enemy were largely due to his able leadership, energy and courage.

The 15th Brigade fought in the Second Battle of Bullecourt in May 1917, and the Battle of Polygon Wood at the end of September. According to Charles Bean, this victory was

largely due to the perfect protection afforded by the artillery, but also largely to the vigour with which the 15th Brigade and the troops reinforcing it snatched complete success from an almost desperate situation on the right. Elliott himself, if asked, would have said that the counter-attack at Villers-Bretonneux seven months later was the fight of his lifetime, but most of his subordinates would probably answer for him "Polygon Wood." His staunchness and vehemence, and power of instilling those qualities into his troops, had turned his brigade into a magnificently effective instrument; and the driving force of this stout-hearted leader in his inferno at Hooge throughout the two critical days was in a large measure responsible for this victory.

For Elliott, the victory was marred by the death of his brother George, a captain in the Medical Corps attached to the 14th Brigade. He submitted a detailed report of the battle that was highly critical of the British 33rd Division on his right flank, and which Birdwood ordered suppressed. Elliott was mentioned in despatches.

In March 1918, a British Army captain was apprehended in Corbie looting champagne. The culprit was handed over to the military police, and Elliott posted a proclamation that the next officer found looting would be publicly hanged in the village market square, in emulation of the actions of Major General Robert Craufurd. He reasoned that the enlisted men could not be expected to refrain from looting if officers set a bad example. The Second Battle of Villers-Bretonneux in April 1918, was another famous victory, praised by Marshal Ferdinand Foch for its "altogether astonishing valiance". Elliott was again mentioned in despatches, and made a Companion of the Order of the Bath.

Bean wrote that

Even during the war, he sometimes gave the impression of boylike playing at soldiering. Yet no one was more wholly in earnest, and his powerful will and personality and control over his troops made him always a factor to be reckoned with in the AIF. They knew that he would fight tooth and nail against any order committing them to an attack that he believed to be impossible; he had saved them from one such trial near Flers in the mud of October 1916. From daily experience they trusted completely to his competence. If "the Old Man" said an operation was possible, then it was possible for the 15th Brigade. His attitude naturally led him to centre his interests on his own command. Though he was a solicitor by profession, his military career meant everything to him; his pride in his own powers and achievements was intense. But, unlike most egoists, he extended his interest to every man in his brigade, and, after his brigade, to the whole of the AIF. These proclivities-and his personal experience of troops of the British "New Army" at Fromelles, in the open warfare beyond Bapaume, at Polygon Wood, and lately in the Third and Fifth Armies-led him to be contemptuous of their fighting power ; and this, together with a hot-headed tendency to use his brigade as if it were independent of the rest of the BEF, caused not infrequent trouble, and was a chief cause of his being eventually excluded from higher command in the AIF. Nevertheless he was an outstandingly strong, capable, and sympathetic leader; and in his directness and simplicity, and in a baffling streak of humility that shot through his seemingly absorbing vanity, there were elements of real greatness.

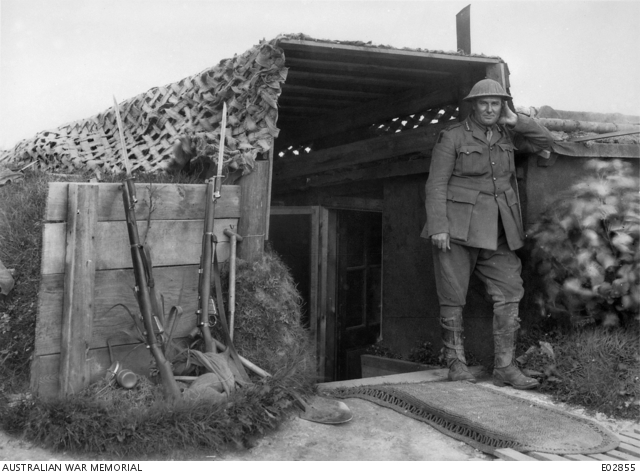
Elliott standing at the door of a captured German divisional headquarters near Harbonnieres captured in the Battle of Amiens

Elliott was deeply disappointed at being passed over for command of a division in favour of John Gellibrand and William Glasgow, who were of equal seniority. He continued to lead the 15th Brigade, which fought in the Battle of Hamel on 4 July 1918, the Battle of Amiens on 8 August, and the Battle of St. Quentin Canal in August and September. At Peronne on 1 September, after leading his troops across a damaged bridge over the Somme River, he slipped and fell in the river. The division radio network became clogged with stations repeating the message that "Pompey's fallen in the Somme". During the mutinies over disbanding battalions in September 1918, Elliott was the only brigade commander with sufficient sway over his men for a battalion, the 60th, to obey his order to disband.

As the members of the brigade began to return to Australia after the war, he became increasingly depressed. Eventually, he called a parade to hand out some last medals, and gave them a farewell speech to thank them for upholding his demanding standards. They were then dismissed and he returned to his paperwork. Later that afternoon, the brigade returned to his chateau preceded by bands and colours. Each company circled the chateau and cheered for their commander. Lastly, the senior colonel called for three cheers and told Elliott that the men wanted to show their appreciation for him and that, despite it being a voluntary march, everyone was there. He was mentioned in despatches twice more, and awarded the French Croix de Guerre.

== Political service ==
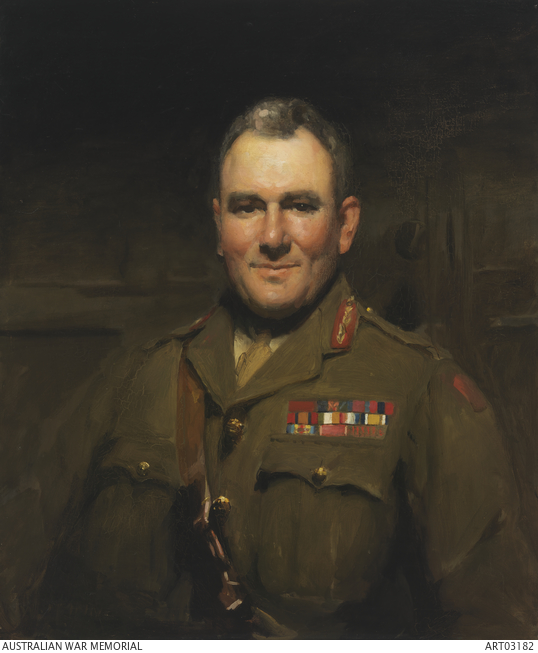
Portrait of Elliott by William Beckwith McInnes, 1921

Elliott embarked for Australia on the RMS Orontes on 15 May 1919, sharing a cabin with an old friend, Brigadier General Gordon Bennett. They arrived back in Melbourne on 28 June, and his AIF appointment was terminated the following day. He contested the federal election as a candidate for the Nationalist Party of Australia on 13 December 1919. He achieved the greatest popular vote of any Victorian candidate for the Senate. Moreover, he repeated this success at the 1925 election. Although not naturally suited to life in the federal parliament, he made significant contributions, and was outspoken in his efforts to assist returned servicemen, particularly those with whom he had served. This outspokenness often took the form of arguing in the Senate in relation to new legislation being brought before it, when such legislation involved the defence forces. At other times, he would personally champion the cause of those men who had been in his battalion.

In 1919, Elliott became Melbourne's city solicitor, and around this time founded H. E. Elliott and Downing, solicitors, with fellow-digger W. H. Downing and offices in Collins Street. His involvement with returned servicemen's issues led to his redrafting the constitution of the Returned Sailors and Soldiers Imperial League of Australia. He played an important part in the Victoria Police strike, making a call alongside Lieutenant General Sir John Monash for members of the AIF to come to Melbourne Town Hall and sign up as special constables. Many men came specifically for Elliott, ready to stand behind him again, although he was forced to leave only a few days into the Strike to attend meetings in Queensland of the Royal Commission on the Navigation Act. He received special thanks from the Premier of Victoria, Harry Lawson. He built a house at 56 Prospect Hill Road, Camberwell, where he lived with his wife, children, sister-in-law Belle, and mother-in-law, Mary Campbell, until she died in 1923. He often attended functions escorted by Belle. Violet attended Fintona Girls' School while Neil went to Camberwell Grammar School.

With considerable justice, Elliott felt that he had been sidelined by the new leadership of the Australian Army. This was most probably due to his tactlessness, particularly in relation to post-war changes of policy, and regarding the wartime records of some of those now being selected for the prime military appointments, particularly Lieutenant General Sir Brudenell White, who was now the Chief of the General Staff. In 1921, the Army established a division structure, and the two divisions in Victoria, the 3rd and 4th were given to Gellibrand and Charles Brand respectively. Elliott used the Senate as a forum to protest this, and he was supported by fellow senators and generals, Charlie Cox and Edmund Drake-Brockman. White was succeeded as Chief of the General Staff by Lieutenant General Sir Harry Chauvel in 1926, and he moved to rehabilitate Elliott, who was appointed to command the 15th Brigade again. In 1927, he was finally promoted to the rank of major general, and became the commander of the 3rd Division.

== Death ==
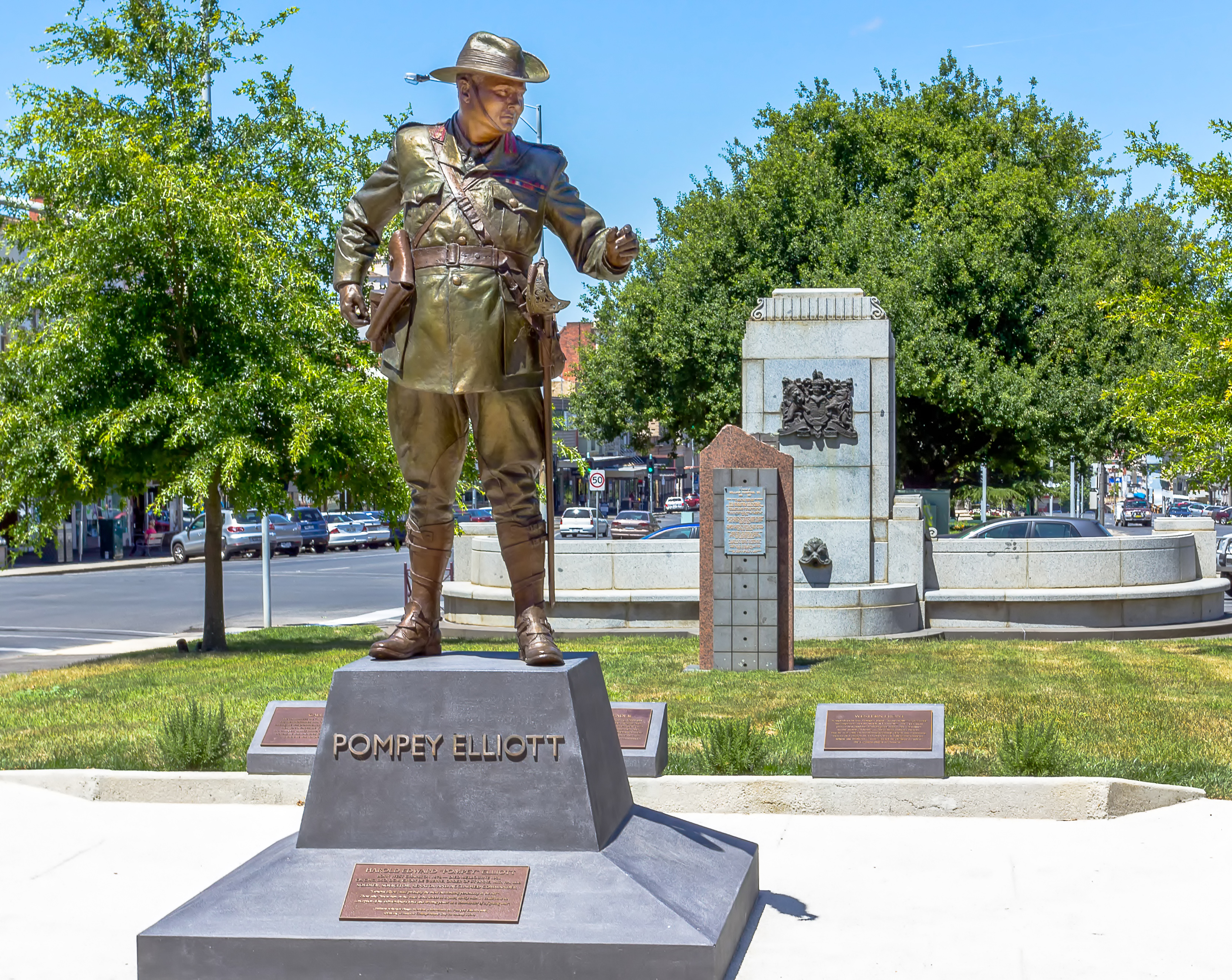
Statue of Elliott in Ballarat

Increasingly, Elliott suffered from diabetes, hypertension, and what was diagnosed by Dr J. F. Williams as a "definite form of nervous disorder", now most likely post traumatic stress disorder and major depressive disorder. He was admitted to the Alfred Hospital on 16 February 1931 after making an attempt to gas himself in the oven at his house. His older sister Nell died by suicide, as had a niece. Early on the morning of 23 March 1931, Elliott committed suicide by cutting himself with his shaving razor while an inpatient in a private hospital in Malvern.

Elliott's funeral took place on 25 March. Following a short service at his home, his casket was drawn, with full military honours including bands and an escort party, on a gun carriage pulled by horses resplendent with black plumes, to the Burwood Cemetery, a march of some four miles. Stanley Bruce, whose premiership came to an end in late 1929, marched as a common returned soldier. Reports in the newspapers of the time state that several thousand people followed the cortège and lined the parade route. The parade was led by Rear Admiral William Munro Kerr, with Brigadier Generals Charles Brand, Thomas Blamey and J. C. Stewart. His grave bears the epitaph (from Shakespeare's Julius Caesar) "This was a man".

His papers are held by the Australian War Memorial in Canberra.

== In popular culture ==
Elliott was portrayed by Francis Bell in the 1985 Anzacs television miniseries.

Pompey Elliott was one of the six Australians whose war experiences were presented in The War That Changed Us, a four-part television documentary series about Australia's involvement in World War I.

A street in Ascot Vale, Victoria, was created in the Whiskey Hill subdivision around 6 km north of Melbourne in around 1930 and named after Elliott. The street is called Elliott Street and is a time capsule of early 1930s architecture.

== Notes ==
Military offices
Preceded by Major General George Johnston	General Officer Commanding 3rd Division; 1927–1931	Succeeded by Major General Sir Thomas Blamey
