= Harold Elliott =

Harold Elliott may refer to:

- H. A. Elliott (Harold A. Elliott, 1890–1939), American lawyer and attorney from Arizona
- Hal Elliott (Harold William Elliott, 1899–1963), American baseball player
- Harold Elliott (American football) ("Bud" Elliott, 1931–2005), American football coach
- Harold Elliott (Australian Army officer) (nicknamed "Pompey", 1878–1931), Australian Major General and politician
- Harold Elliott (artist) (1890–1968), Canadian painter
- Rowdy Elliott (Harold Bell Elliott, 1890–1934), American baseball player
- Harold Elliott (cricketer) (1904–1969), English cricketer

== See also ==
- Harry Elliott (disambiguation)
