= Charles Brand (general) =

Australian politician

Major General Charles Henry Brand CB, CMG, CVO, DSO
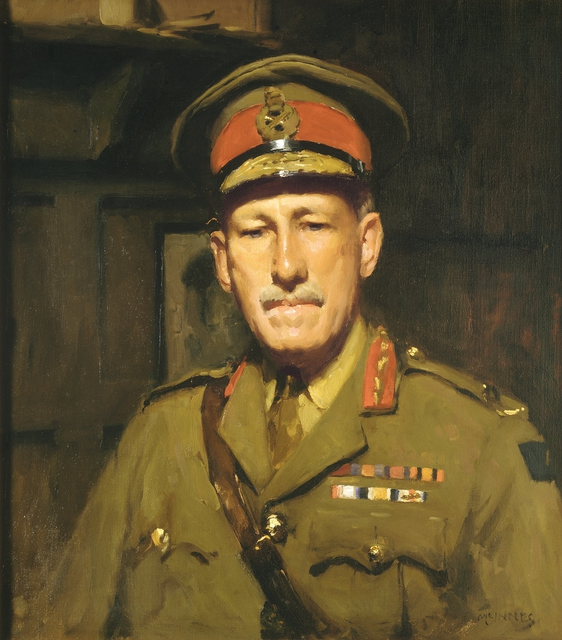
- Portrait of Chales Brand drawn in 1921

Senator for Victoria
- In office 1 July 1935 – 30 June 1947

Personal details
- Born: 4 September 1873 Ipswich, Queensland
- Died: 31 July 1961 (aged 87) Toorak, Victoria
- Party: United Australia Party (1935–45); Liberal Party of Australia (1945–47)

Military service
- Allegiance: Australia
- Branch/service: Australian Army
- Years of service: 1898–1933
- Rank: Major General
- Commands: 4th Brigade (1916–18); 6th Brigade (1915–16); 3rd Battalion (1915)
- Battles/wars: Second Boer War; First World War; Gallipoli campaign; Battle of Pozières; Battle of Arras; Battle of Messines; Battle of Passchendaele
- Awards: Companion of the Order of the Bath; Companion of the Order of St Michael and St George; Commander of the Royal Victorian Order; Distinguished Service Order; Mentioned in Despatches (7)

Major General Charles Henry Brand, CB, CMG, CVO, DSO (4 September 1873 – 31 July 1961) was an Australian Army officer and politician. He rose to the rank of brigadier general in the First World War, retired as a major general in 1933 and was elected to the Australian Senate representing Victoria for the United Australia Party from 1935 to 1947.

== Early life and career ==
Charles Henry Brand was born in Ipswich, Queensland, on 4 September 1873, one of the five children of a farmer. He was educated at Bundaberg and Maryborough State Schools and joined the Department of Public Instruction as a teacher in November 1887.

On 17 February 1898, Brand was commissioned as a lieutenant in the Queensland Volunteer Infantry. On the outbreak of the Second Boer War in South Africa, he enlisted as a sergeant in the 3rd Queensland (Mounted Infantry) Contingent. Brand served with the Rhodesian Field Force from 26 April 1900 to 25 May 1900. He was promoted to lieutenant on 25 June 1900 and then in Transvaal participating in the action at Renosterkop on 29 November 1900. He then served in the Orange Free State, the Cape Colony, before returning to Transvaal. He returned to Australia in June 1901, but in May 1902 he volunteered for a second tour, and was promoted to captain in command of a squadron the 7th Commonwealth Light Horse. However, peace was declared before the unit reached South Africa.

Once more in Australia, Brand resumed his pre-war career as a teacher, teaching at Charters Towers State School from 1903 to 1904. He was promoted to captain in the Queensland Volunteer Infantry on 27 March 1903, serving as adjutant from 1 September 1902 to 30 November 1905.

In 1905, Brand joined the permanent forces as a lieutenant and joined the Administrative and Instructional Corps located in Melbourne. He was promoted to the rank of captain in July 1909. In 1910, he was sent to India on an officer exchange. He served as a General Staff Officer (GSO) at Secunderabad, as Deputy Adjutant and Quartermaster General of the 1st and 2nd Secunderabad Infantry Brigades, as a staff captain with the Secunderabad Cavalry Brigade. He also attended the transport and musketry schools in 1911. Brand returned to Australia in September 1911 holding the position of General Staff Officer (third grade) (GSO3) in Adelaide until 26 November 1913. For a short time in late 1913 Brand took temporary command of the 4th Military District (South Australia), in June 1914 Brand returned to his previous post of GSO3.

== First World War ==
Brand joined the Australian Imperial Force as a major on 15 August 1914. Major General William Throsby Bridges selected Brand as the brigade major of the 3rd Infantry Brigade. Brand departed for Egypt on board the Orvieto on 21 October 1914. During his stay in Egypt Brand became a recognisable sight, going about his duties on a donkey when other transport was scarce.

The 3rd Brigade was the first unit to hit the beaches at Anzac Cove on 25 April 1915, Brand landed at around 7am. Brand was ordered to take the 400 Plateau, later in the day Brand attempted to create defensive positions here with elements of the Australian 9th and 10th battalions.

On 16 May 1915, Brand took over temporary command of the 3rd Infantry Battalion. Then on 20 May he was transferred to the 8th Infantry Battalion. The following day he was wounded when a German naval shell struck its headquarters but remained on duty. On 2 June 1915, he was awarded the Distinguished Service Order, becoming the first Australian to receive the award for the Gallipoli campaign. The medal's citation, appearing in The London Gazette in July 1915, reads as follows:

On 25th April, 1915, during operations in the neighbourhood of Gaba Tepe, for conspicuous gallantry and ability in organising stragglers under heavy fire, and for organising and leading an attack resulting in the disablement of three of the enemy's guns. Major Brand conveyed messages himself on many occasions under fire during emergencies.

On 14 July 1915, he took over permanent command of the 8th Battalion, and was promoted to the rank of lieutenant colonel. The 8th Battalion relieved the 6th and 7th Battalions at Steele's Post on 18 July so that they could participate in the attack on Lone Pine. The 8th Battalion held Steele's Post for the rest of the campaign.

The 8th Battalion moved to the Western Front during March 1916. From 6 to 27 June 1916, Brand was acting commander of the 6th Infantry Brigade, standing in for Brigadier General John Gellibrand, who had been wounded. After this, Brand was marked for the next brigade appointment, and on 10 July 1916, he succeeded Brigadier General John Monash, who went on to command the 3rd Australian Division, in command of the 4th Infantry Brigade, and was promoted temporary brigadier general while employed in this role. Brand led the brigade at Pozières later that month. Brand was a vocal opponent to the attack on Bullecourt during the Battle of Arras in April 1917 which cost his brigade 2,339 casualties out of 3,000 engaged, of whom about 1,000 were prisoners. Later Brand and Lieutenant General William Birdwood, GOC of the Australian Corps, apologised to the brigade, with tears in their eyes.

The brigade took part in the Battle of Messines in June. On 6 July 1917, the staff of the 4th Brigade was sitting down to dinner when a German 5.9 inch shell landed among them. Lieutenant Markam the brigade intelligence officer, was killed and Brand, his brigade major, Major Johnston, staff captain, Captain Thomson, and signal officer, Lieutenant Beazley, were all wounded. Brand rejoined the brigade on 18 July and led it at the Battle of Passchendaele (or Third battle of Ypres).

During the German spring offensive, which began in March 1918, the 4th Brigade was sent to cover a gap around the town of Hebuterne, which it managed to hold for three weeks. From 9 to 25 July 1918, Brand was acting commander of the 4th Division. During the attack on the Hindenburg Line, Brand was the head of a contingent of 109 Australian advisors attached to the U.S. 27th Division of the American Expeditionary Forces and helped lead it through its first divisional strength battle.

On 5 October 1918, shortly before the war came to an end, Brand left the 4th Brigade to return to Australia on Anzac Leave. Before sailing for Australia he was presented with the Companion of the Order of the Bath, Companion of the Order of St Michael and St George and Distinguished Service Order at Buckingham Palace. For his services during the war, he had been Mentioned in Despatches eight times. Brand arrived in Australia on 21 December 1918 and his appointment to the AIF was terminated on 21 February 1919.

== Post-war ==
From 1919 to 1920, Brand was commandant of the 3rd Military District (Victoria). He was confirmed in the rank of brigadier general on 1 April 1920 and was base commandant of the 2nd Military District (New South Wales) from 1921 to 1925. He became 2nd Chief of the General Staff (CGS) and a member of the Military Board in 1926. In 1927, Brand was appointed a Commander of the Royal Victorian Order (CVO) following his services in the Duke and Dutchess of York's visit to Australia in order to open the new Federal capital in Canberra. From 1928 to 1933 he was Quartermaster General. He retired in 1933 with the rank of major general.

In 1934 Brand won an Australian Senate seat for the United Australia Party, which he held until June 1947. He was most concerned with defence policy and veterans' affairs and was chairman of the Parliamentary Ex-Servicemen's Committee from 1942 to 1947.

Brand died on 31 July 1961, and was cremated with full military honours.
