= Henry Eliot =

Henry Eliot may refer to:

- Henry Eliot Howard (1873–1940), amateur English ornithologist
- Henry Eliot, 5th Earl of St Germans (1835–1911)
- Henry Ware Eliot (1843–1919), American industrialist and philanthropist
- Henry Eliot (author), British author

== See also ==
- Henry Elliot (disambiguation)
- Henry Elliott (disambiguation)
