= Henry Elliott =

Henry Elliott may refer to:

- Henry Elliott (athlete) (born 1946), French high jumper
- Henry Wood Elliott (1846–1930), American watercolor painter, author, and environmentalist
- Henry Wood Elliott II (1920–1976), American physician and pharmacologist
- Henry Venn Elliott (1792–1865), English divine
- Henry S. Elliott (1858–1942), American attorney and politician

== See also ==
- Henry Elliot (disambiguation)
- Henry Eliot (disambiguation)
- Harry Elliott (disambiguation)
