= New South Wales Imperial Bushmen =

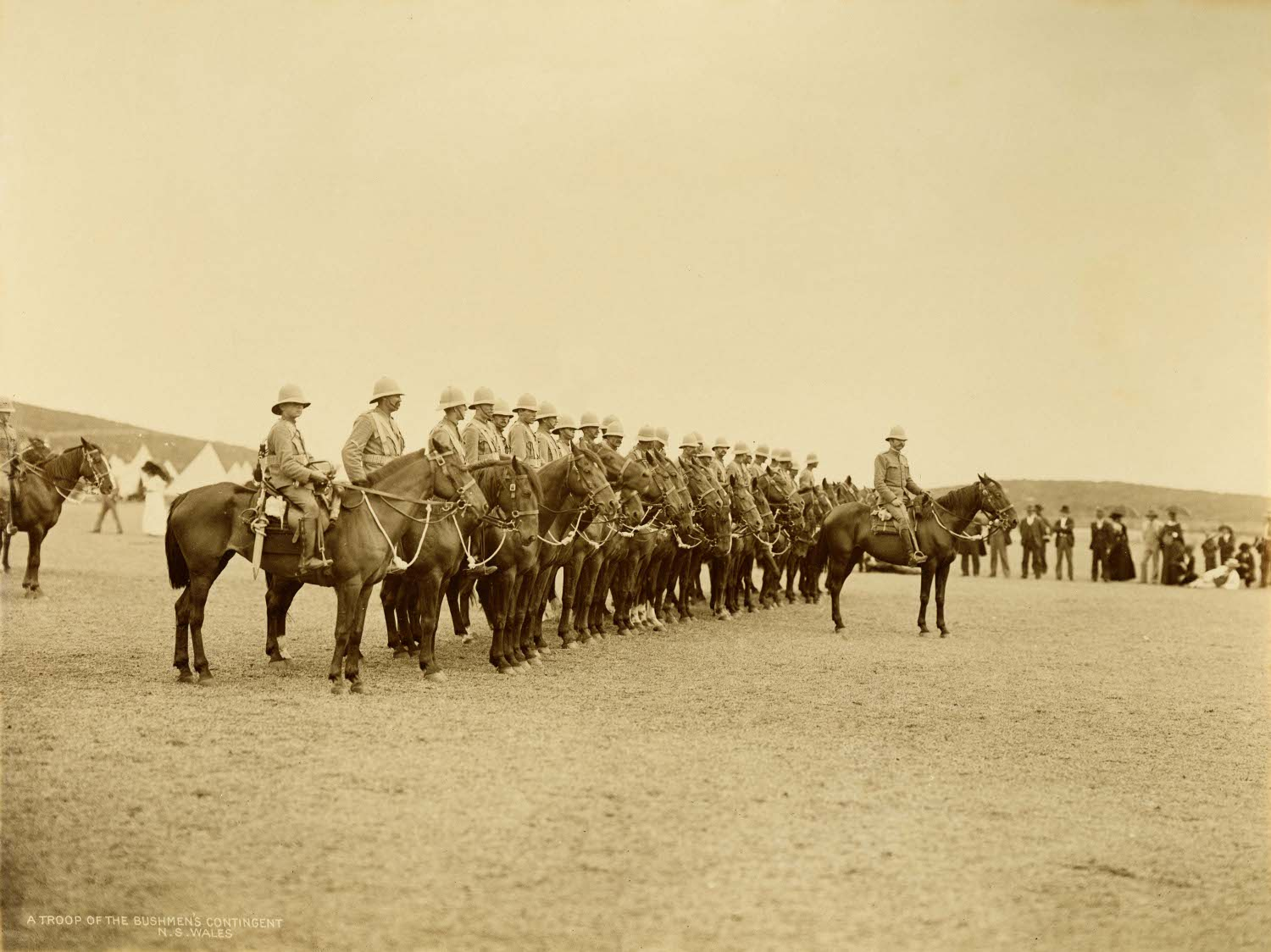
- A troop of Bushmen's Contingent
- Active: 1900–1901
- Country: New South Wales
- Allegiance: British Empire
- Type: Mounted Infantry
- Size: 762 men Six squadrons
- Engagements: Second Boer War

Commanders
- Notable commanders: Kenneth Mackay

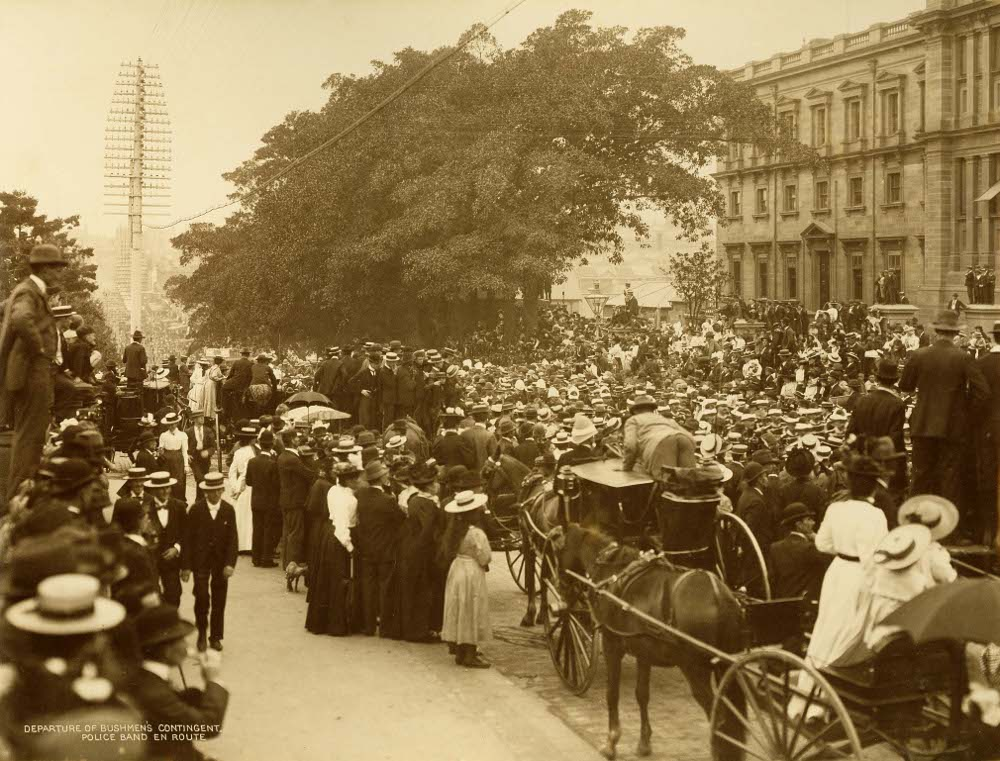
The Bushmen's contingent departing for South Africa in 1900.

The New South Wales Imperial Bushmen was a mounted regiment, consisting of six rifle squadrons, raised in the New South Wales colony for service during the Second Boer War.

The volunteers came from Cootamundra, Gundagai, Wagga Wagga, Young, Hay, Cooma, Moree, Cobar, Tenterfield, and Bourke. Formed as the sixth contingent of Imperial Bushman, with an original strength of 762 men under the command of Lieutenant Colonel Kenneth Mackay, the unit departed Sydney for South Africa on 23 April 1900 on the transport Armenian. Between May 1900 and May 1901 it served in Rhodesia as part of the Rhodesian Field Force under Lieutenant General Sir Frederick Carrington and later in West Transvaal, including the capture of Koos de la Rey's convoy and guns at Wildfontein on 24 March 1901. Lieutenant Colonel Haviland Le Mesurier took over as commanding officer in November 1900. The unit departed East London on the transport Orient and returned to Australia on 17 July 1901. Casualties included 13 killed or died of wounds and nine died of disease. Members of the regiment received one Companion of The Most Honourable Order of the Bath, 4 Distinguished Service Orders and 1 Distinguished Conduct Medal.

== Commanding officers ==
The following officers commanded the unit:

- Mackay, Kenneth
- Le Mesurier, Haviland
