= Haviland Le Mesurier =

Australian soldier

- Born: 6 February 1856; Fremantle, Western Australia
- Died: 25 November 1913 (aged 57); Adelaide, South Australia
- Military career
- Allegiance: Australia
- Branch: New South Wales Military Forces (1886–1901); Australian Army (1901–13)
- Service years: 1886–1913
- Rank: Colonel
- Commands: Military Forces in South Australia (1910–13); 8th Battalion Australian Commonwealth Horse (1902); New South Wales Imperial Bushmen (1900–01)
- Conflicts: Second Boer War

Colonel Haviland Le Mesurier (6 February 1856 – 25 November 1913) was an Australian soldier.

Born in Fremantle, Western Australia on 6 February 1856, he attended schooling at the Bedford Grammar School, England, and also in Europe.

Le Mesurier returned to Australia (New South Wales) in 1884, and obtained a commission in the Royal Artillery in 1886. He was posted to the New South Wales Artillery and was the acting adjutant of the 1st Garrison Division between December 1890 and September 1891 and acting staff officer between October 1891 until June 1893. Promoted to Captain in 1893, he returned to England for training and passed the gunnery course at Woolwich and Shoeburyness in 1894, for which he received a first-class certificate with honours.

During the Second Boer War, Le Mesurier was second in command of the New South Wales Imperial Bushmen until he was appointed to command the 8th Battalion, Australian Commonwealth Horse. He took part in operations in Rhodesia, Transvaal, west of Pretoria, Transvaal Orange River Colony and Cape Colony.

Following the Boer War, Le Mesurier was appointed the commandant of military forces in South Australia. He died on 25 November 1913.
