= Henry Elliot (disambiguation) =

Henry Elliot was a British diplomat.

Henry Elliot is also the name of:

- Henry Miers Elliot (1808–1853), Indian civil servant and historian
- Henry George Elliot (1826–1907), Canadian-born soldier and administrator

== See also ==
- Henry Elliott (disambiguation)
- Henry Eliot (disambiguation)
- Harry Elliot (1920–2009)
