= Harry Elliott =

Harry Elliott may refer to:

- Harry Elliott (baseball) (1923–2013), major league outfielder
- Harry Elliott (English cricketer) (1891–1976), English wicket keeper
- Harry Elliott (New Zealand cricketer) (1870–1941), New Zealand cricketer
- Harry Elliott (wrestling promoter) (1905–2006), American wrestling promoter considered the oldest surviving professional wrestler
- H. Chandler Elliott (1909–1978), physician and writer

== See also ==
- Harry Elliot (1920–2009), British space scientist
- Harry Eliott (1882–1959), French painter and illustrator
- Harold Elliott (disambiguation)
- Henry Elliott (disambiguation)
