= George Johnston (general) =

Australian general

George Jameson Johnston
- Born: 24 October 1868; East Melbourne, Victoria
- Died: 23 May 1949 (aged 80); Melbourne, Victoria
- Burial place: Brighton Cemetery
- Military career
- Allegiance: Australia
- Branch: Australian Army
- Service years: 1887–c.1927
- Rank: Major General
- Commands: 3rd Division (1922–27); 2nd Divisional Artillery (1916–17); 3rd Infantry Brigade (1915); 2nd Field Artillery Brigade (1914–15); Victorian Brigade, Australian Field Artillery (1910–14); 4th Battalion, Australian Commonwealth Horse (1902)
- Conflicts: Second Boer War; First World War; Gallipoli Campaign; Western Front; Battle of Pozières; Third Battle of Ypres
- Awards: Companion of the Order of the Bath; Companion of the Order of St Michael and St George; Commander of the Order of the British Empire; Colonial Auxiliary Forces Officers' Decoration; Mentioned in Despatches (4)

Major General George Jameson Johnston, CB, CMG, CBE, VD (24 October 1868 – 23 May 1949) was a senior Australian Army officer during the First World War.

== Early life and career ==
George Jameson Johnston was born on 24 October 1868 in East Melbourne, Victoria. He served as a member of the Fitzroy City Council from 1896 to 1899.

In 1887, Johnston enlisted in the militia as a gunner in the Victorian Field Artillery. He was commissioned as a lieutenant in 1889 and promoted to captain in 1895.

He and his wife married in the sistine chapel on 14 August 1897.

== Boer War ==
In 1899, he volunteered for service in South Africa during the Second Boer War, where in November 1899 he was attached to the British 62nd Battery, Royal Field Artillery with the rank of captain. He was promoted to major in March 1900. As commander of a section of two guns, he saw service at Bloemfontein, Klip Drift, Osfontein and Paardeberg. In July 1900 he returned home with a fever. In March 1902 he became a temporary lieutenant colonel commanding the 4th Battalion, Australian Commonwealth Horse but the war ended before he reached South Africa. Johnston was promoted to lieutenant colonel on 24 April 1909 and took command of the Victorian Field Artillery Brigade.

== First World War ==
Johnston joined the Australian Imperial Force on 18 August 1914 as a lieutenant colonel commanding the 2nd Field Artillery Brigade. The brigade sailed for Egypt in October 1914. Guns of the 2nd Field Brigade's 4th Field Battery landed at Anzac Cove on 25 April 1915 and were the first to open fire on the enemy. The rest of the brigade, less the 6th Field Battery, which was diverted to Cape Helles, came ashore the next day, eventually settling on McCay's Hill and MacLagan's Ridge. Johnston was designated as commander of the 2nd Division Artillery but became acting commander of the 1st Division Artillery while Brigadier General Talbot Hobbs was acting 1st Division commander from August to October 1915. He then commanded the 3rd Infantry Brigade until late November.

Johnston was again appointed commander of the 2nd Division Artillery in January 1916. He sailed for France in March and his artillery fired its first barrage on the Germans on 27 April 1916. He commanded the 2nd Division Artillery at Pozières, Lagnicourt, Bullecourt, and Third Ypres.

In October 1917, Johnston became upset when he was superseded by Brigadier General Walter Adams Coxen for the post of Corps Artillery commander on 18 October 1917 and asked to be sent home. General William Birdwood accepted the request, but he was replaced by Brigadier General Owen Phillips on 1 November 1917 and returned to Australia. For his services on the Western Front, Johnston was appointed a Companion of the Order of the Bath (CB) and Companion of the Order of St Michael and St George (CMG); he had been Mentioned in Despatches four times.

== Post-war ==
On 21 April 1918, Johnston became Military Administrator of New Guinea. Johnston brought outlying districts of the territory under more effective control and established some new districts and posts for better control of the territory. Johnston's temperament was not an ideal one for the post of administrator, and he attracted public criticism. On 1 May 1920, he was replaced by Brigadier General Thomas Griffiths.

After the war Johnston resumed his pre-war position as director of Johnston's Pty Ltd. He commanded the 3rd Division from 1922 to 1927 and was promoted to major general on 1 October 1923.

He died on 23 May 1949 and was buried at Brighton Cemetery after a military funeral.

== See also ==
- List of Australian generals

Military offices
Preceded by Major General Sir John Gellibrand	General Officer Commanding 3rd Division; 1922–1927	Succeeded by Major General Harold Elliott
