= Rising Sun badge =

Australian Army insignia

External images
- Earliest Advance Australia coat of arms, presented to Captain Silk c. 1821
- Standard representation of the Advance Australia Arms on a parapet above a row of shops in Hunter Street (eastern end), Newcastle, from the 1880s

The current version of the Australian Army's Rising Sun badge, used from 2025

The Rising Sun badge, officially the Australian Army Badge and previously the General Service Badge, is the official insignia of the Australian Army. It is mostly worn on the brim of a slouch hat or, less frequently, on the front of a peaked cap for Army personnel filling certain ceremonial appointments. The badge is readily identified with the spirit of ANZAC, the legend of the Australian soldier (or digger), and the esprit de corps of the Army itself, due to its association with the landings at Gallipoli in 1915. Today, new recruits receive the badge with their initial issue of equipment, which happens within their first three days of enlistment.

== History ==
=== Origins ===
The origins of the Rising Sun badge are disputed. Rising sun designs had appeared on early Australian colonial coins and military insignia decades before the federation of the Australian colonies in 1901, and may have represented the image of Australia as 'a young nation' and a 'new Britannia'.

As early as the 1820s, the symbol of a rising sun was used by various progressive organisations, loosely characterised under the banner "Advance Australia". The rising sun crest used in the New South Wales colonial and State crests was taken from the crest used on the first Advance Australia Arms, circa 1821, and consistently since then. The oldest known example is the "Advance Australia" coat of arms (named because of the motto inscription), which became widely used in New South Wales and the neighbouring colonies by private corporations and individuals. Although they never had any official status, they formed the basis for several official coats of arms, including the New South Wales coat of arms. The representation below was reputedly painted for Thomas Silk, the son of the captain of the Prince of Orange, a convict ship that visited Sydney in 1821. The symbol struck a chord with the pre-federation population and many examples still exist on colonial architecture.

=== Military use ===
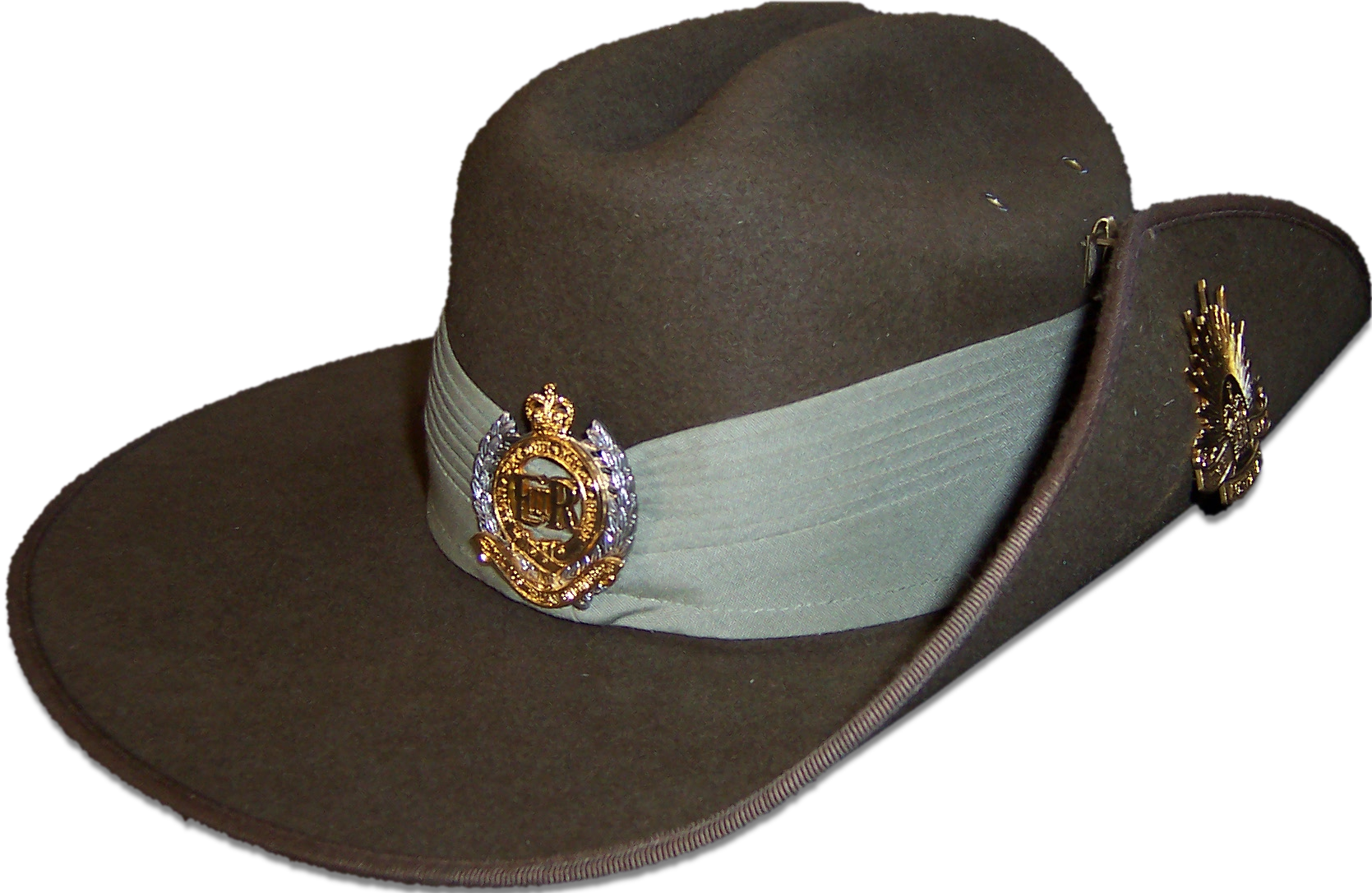
Australian Army slouch hat, detailing the wearing of the Rising Sun badge on the upturned brim

In 1902, a badge was urgently sought for the Australian contingents raised after Federation for service in South Africa during the Second Boer War. The most widely accepted version of the origin of the badge attributes the selection of its design to a British officer, Major General Sir Edward Hutton, the newly appointed General Officer Commanding, Australian Military Forces. The design was first worn by the Australian Commonwealth Horse. Hutton had earlier received a "Trophy of Arms" as a gift from Major Joseph Gordon, a long-standing military acquaintance, comprising mounted cut and thrust swords and triangular Martini Henri bayonets arranged in a semicircle around a brass crown. To Hutton the shield was symbolic of the co-ordination of the Naval and Military Forces of the Commonwealth. Three different designs were created, and they formed the basis of a new design created in 1903, which was subsequently adopted as the General Service Badge in 1911. The original badge bore the words "Australian Commonwealth Military Forces" on the scroll at the bottom. However, because the original design was created in haste, it was subsequently redesigned, and that was the form of the badge worn by soldiers of the First Australian Imperial Force in World War I and the Second Australian Imperial Force (2nd AIF) in World War II, being used on both the slouch hat and the tunic, and it was also used in some Regimental badges.

There were early sardonic references by diggers to the badge's similarity to the logo on Abel Hoadley's well-known "Rising Sun" range of jams and sauces, but whether this gave rise to the badge's universally accepted name is open to conjecture.

Since its inception, the basic form of the 1904 version has remained unchanged, although modifications have been made to the wording on the scroll and to the style of crown. Notably, although no badge was ever struck with the wording "Australian Imperial Force", that wording has been used as a headstone design on war graves. In 1945, the Department of the Army recommended that two separate badges for Army war graves of World War II be used, to distinguish between members of the 2nd AIF and the Militia (later the Australian Army Reserve). Subsequently, the "Australian Imperial Force" inscription appeared only on the headstone badges of 2nd AIF members.

=== Design changes ===
In 1949, when Corps and Regimental badges were reintroduced, the badge was changed again. The wording on the scroll was changed to read "Australian Military Forces", removing the word "Commonwealth". Nevertheless, the earlier badge remained in common use with recruit training units until at least the late 1960s. Regimental badges replaced the Rising Sun badge on the side of slouch hats where available.

Following the ascent of Her Majesty Queen Elizabeth II to the throne, the Crown on the badge was consequently changed from a King's (Tudor) Crown to the St. Edward's Crown on the 1956 version.

In 1969, the badge was again modified to incorporate the Federation Star and Torse Wreath from the original 1902 version of the badge. In 1972, the scroll wording was shortened again to "Australia". However, due to the number of older badges still held in stock this badge was not produced for issue until the late 1980s.

In 1991, a new design, created by Case Wildriks, was produced which returned the design to one similar to that of the original World War I badge, to coincide with the commemoration of the 75th anniversary of the fighting at Gallipoli. The inscription on the scroll was again changed and now reads "The Australian Army". Additionally, the badge was once again worn on the side of slouch hats, with regimental badges moved to the front of the hat.`

In 1995, the badge was altered for the last time when the metal was changed from 1160 aluminium alloy, returning it to brass for the first time since World War II, but with a copper and gold plate, while also raising the crown and arms. The piercings it had in 1914 were reintroduced, thus returning it to its traditional layout. The version used today is the seventh iteration of the design used as the General Service Badge.

== Development of the design ==
Original concept by Major Gordon

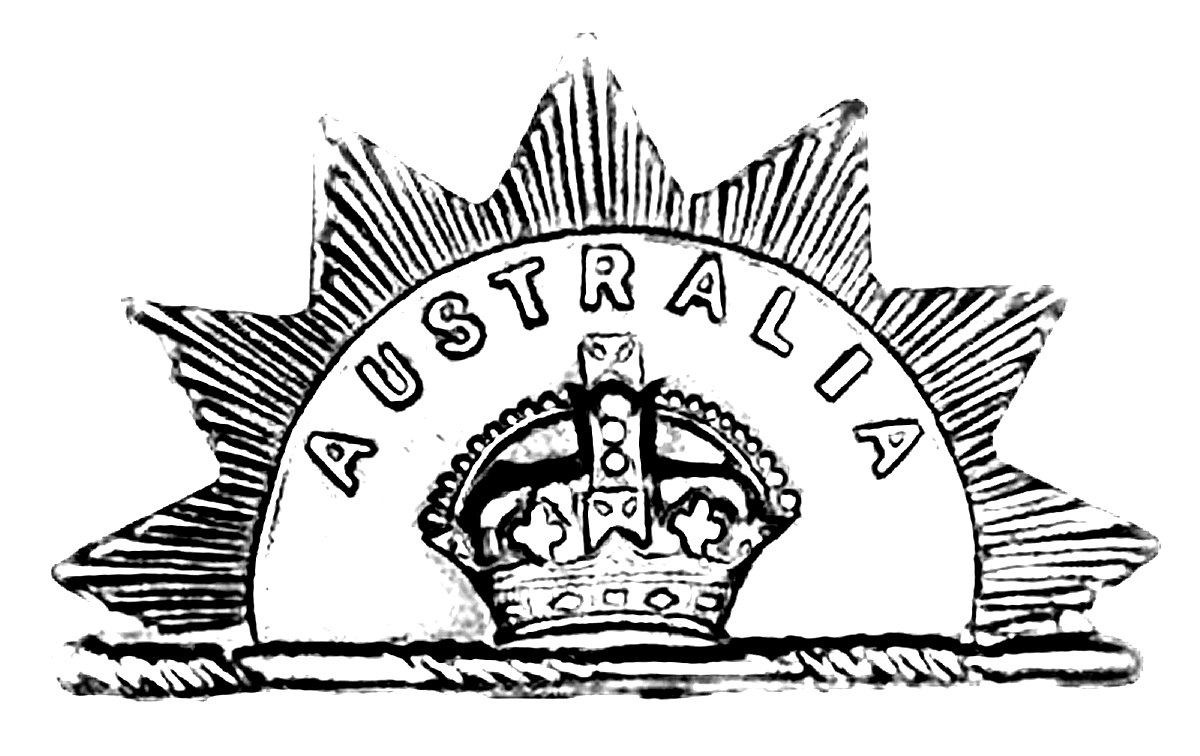
The first pattern of February 1902

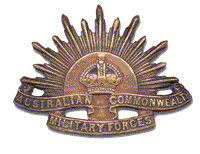
The third pattern, used from 1904 to 1949

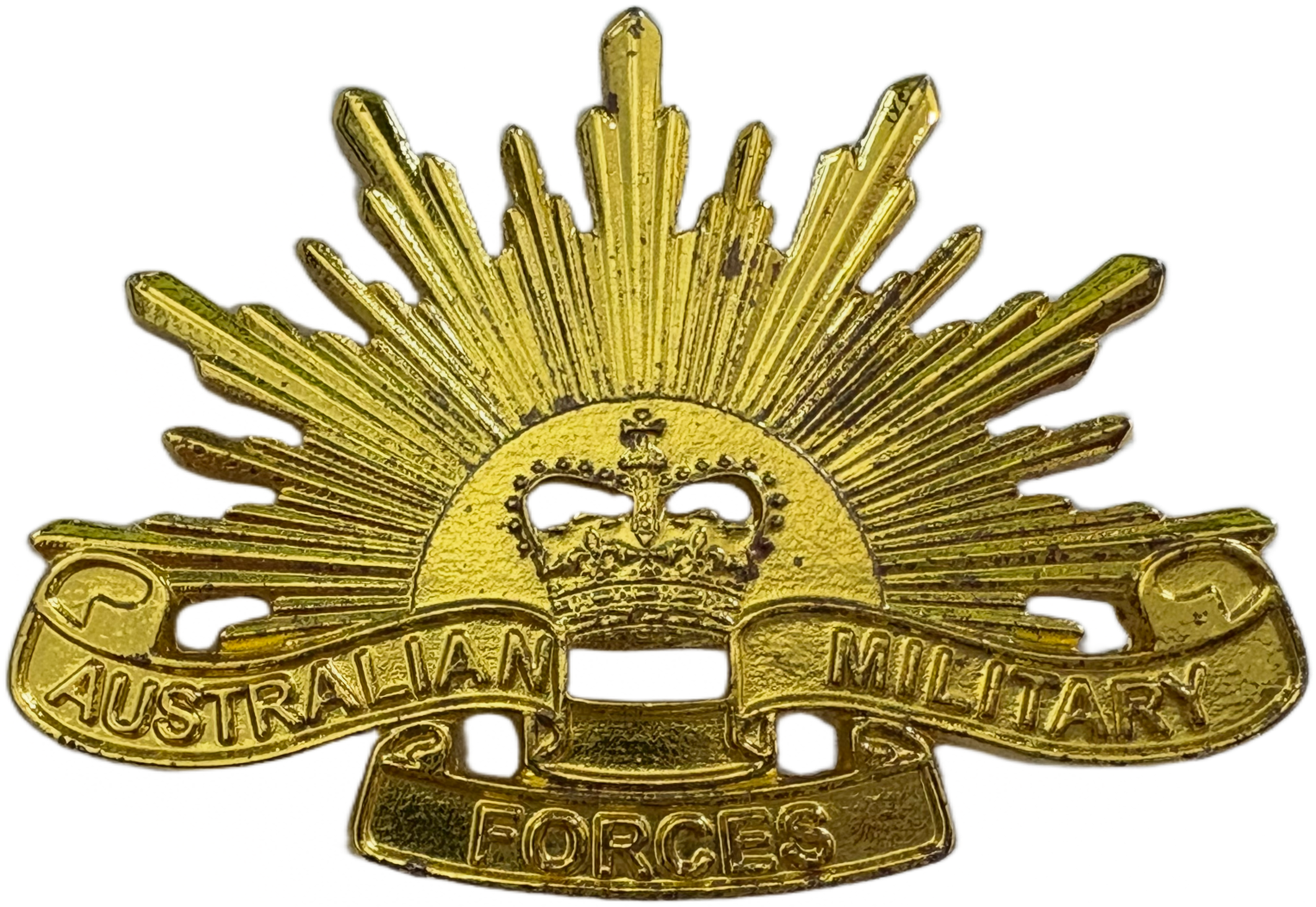
The fifth pattern, used from 1954 to 1969

The sixth pattern, used from 1969 to 1991 (not fully issued)

The seventh pattern, used from 1991 to 2025
