= Brakfontein =

- Location within KwaZulu-Natal Location within South Africa
- Coordinates: 28.656°S 29.914°E
- Country: South Africa
- Province: KwaZulu-Natal
- District: Uthukela
- Municipality: Alfred Duma

Area
  - Total: 43.79 km^{2} (16.91 sq mi)

Population (2011)
  - Total: 3,353
  - Density: 76.57/km^{2} (198.3/sq mi)

Racial makeup (2011)
  - Black African: 99.9%
  - Indian/Asian: 0.1%

First languages (2011)
  - Zulu: 96.3%
  - English: 1.5%
  - Other: 2.2%
- Time zone: UTC+2 (SAST)

Brakfontein is a town in Uthukela District Municipality in the KwaZulu-Natal province of South Africa.
