= Australian Commonwealth Horse =

Mounted infantry unit of the Australian Army

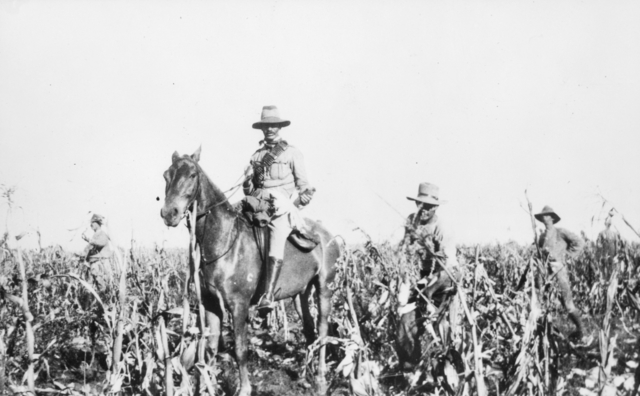
- Troops of 1st Battalion, Australian Commonwealth Horse in the Transvaal 1902.
- Active: 1902
- Country: Australia
- Allegiance: British Empire
- Branch: Army
- Type: Mounted infantry
- Size: Eight battalions
- Engagements: Second Boer War

The Australian Commonwealth Horse (ACH) was a mounted infantry unit of the Australian Army formed for service during the Second Boer War in South Africa in 1902 and was the first expeditionary military unit established by the newly formed Commonwealth of Australia following Federation in 1901. Over 4,400 men enlisted in the ACH in three contingents, with troops and squadrons raised in each state and combined to form battalions. Eight battalions were raised, with the first arriving in Durban in March 1902. The 1st and 2nd battalions saw limited active service, conducting patrols against the Boers during the last great drives that ultimately ended the war. The war ended before the remaining battalions arrived to see action, and by the time peace came on 31 May 1902, the majority of the third contingent, consisting of the 5th, 6th, 7th and 8th Battalions, still remained at sea bound for South Africa. The ACH suffered no fatal casualties in action, although 28 men died from illness.

== Organisation ==
Contingent	Unit	Strength	Composition	Commanding Officer
First	1st Battalion; 2nd Battalion; Australian Army Medical Corps	560; 613; 183	NSW, QLD, TAS; VIC, SA, WA; NSW, VIC, QLD, SA, WA	Lt Col. J. S. Lyster; Lt Col. Duncan McLeish; Maj. T. A. Green and Maj. Neville Howse
Second	3rd Battalion 4th Battalion	615 492	NSW, QLD, TAS VIC, SA, WA	Lt Col. Ernest Wallack; Lt Col. Robert Wallace; Lt Col. George Johnston
Third	5th Battalion; 6th Battalion; 7th Battalion; 8th Battalion	487; 489; 490; 485	NSW; VIC; QLD; SA, WA, TAS	Lt Col. James Macarthur-Onslow; Lt Col. Godfrey Irving; Lt Col. Harry Chauvel; Lt Col. Haviland Le Mesurier

== History ==
=== Raising and training, January 1902 ===
Following the federation of the Australian colonies into the Commonwealth of Australia in 1901, the new Federal government alone had the power to raise military forces and dispatch them overseas. As such it now took over the military establishments of the States and as a consequence, following an approach by the British government, the Australian Prime Minister Edmund Barton agreed to provide a contingent of 1,000 mounted infantry to the continuing conflict in South Africa. This commitment was endorsed in the House of Representatives on 14 January 1902 and the size of the contingent grew over the coming months as more volunteers rushed to join the new force, to be known as the Australian Commonwealth Horse. The formation of the ACH was overseen by the newly appointed General Officer Commanding, Australian Military Forces, Major General Edward Hutton, and was Australia's first expeditionary force. More than 4,400 men ultimately enrolled, and they were formed into troops and squadrons based on their state of origin, before being combined into battalions. Eight battalions were raised in three separate contingents, while a medical team from the Australian Army Medical Corps (AAMC) was also raised. Artillery was not required.

Recruits had to pass tests of elementary riding and shooting, as well as medical tests, amid considerable competition for limited places. Most volunteers were young, single and worked with their hands. Motivations for joining varied, with many seeking to escape from a worsening drought, high unemployment and a heat wave which was gripping Australia at the time. Men from the colonial contingents already in South Africa were also encouraged to join. Competition for commissions and battalion commands was also fierce and the decision was made to appoint all officers in Australia in order to avoid some of the previous problems of 'importing officers' to positions of command. Hutton was also keen to reserve positions for senior permanent force officers so that they may get experience in leadership and staff work, and five of the eight battalion commands were initially allocated to permanent force officers. This had its own draw backs with a number of appointments later disputed, and one—Wallack—was later dismissed amid claims of inefficiency and ill discipline. Training commenced at a high tempo, with Hutton keen to instil professionalism and a high level of discipline in the new force.

The first contingent of 1,300 men sailed between 12 and 26 February 1902, with the second of 1,100 departing between 26 March – 8 April and the third contingent of 2,000 men leaving between 16 May – 2 June. Included among them were Brudenell White and Julius Bruche, both of whom would later rise to become Chief of the General Staff. They were the first Australian troops to wear the Rising Sun badge, a design chosen for the unit by Hutton.

=== Active service in South Africa, March – April 1902 ===
The 1st and 2nd Battalions, Australian Commonwealth Horse arrived in Durban in March 1902 and together with the AAMC were formed into an Australian Brigade. From Durban the Australians were sent north by train via Ladysmith, Elandslaagte and Dundee to Newcastle. By 22 March over 1,000 Australians moved into camp with another 1,000 New Zealanders in the vicinity of Mount Majuba. The brigade subsequently took part in the great Eastern Drive which aimed to encircle de Wet and Louis Botha in northern Natal, however severe weather allowed the Boers to escape. At any rate the ACH played only a secondary role in the drive, consigned mainly to holding the Drakensberg ranges. During late March and early April the ACH were deployed to outposts to block the mountain passes, while a large column drove the Boers towards a line of blockhouses. Apart from minor skirmishes with unseen Boer snipers the Australians saw little action.

The Australians were subsequently sent to western Transvaal, joining Colonel Thornycroft's Field Force at Klerksdorp. The column—which was predominantly Australian and included the Third New South Wales Bushmen, Haslee's Scouts (an irregular unit composed of Australians), the AAMC, the Eighth New Zealand Brigade and Thornycroft's own regular mounted infantry—advanced as part of General Ian Hamilton's force numbering 20,000 men in the great Western Drive. The advance aimed to drive de la Rey back against a chain of blockhouses between Klerksdorp–Ventersdorp and proved to be the last of the war. The drive began on 19 April, but halted soon after, following news that peace negotiations were progressing. On 21 April the ACH moved out of camp and turned away from the blockhouse line towards the western railway, with orders to destroy crops and mealie fields and to push the Boers back towards the railway barrier.

On 7 May the Australians again advanced, driving forward over four successive days across dry and open country over a large front. Ultimately the drive succeeded with few incidents, significantly diminished the Boer supplies in the area, and leading to the capture of thousands of head of livestock, nearly 200 wagons and 7,000 rounds of ammunition. Although hundreds escaped, 367 Boers were captured after becoming trapped, although only one was killed. There were no Australian casualties.

The continued success of the blockhouse system, coupled with the approaching winter and shortages of food and clothing forced the Boer leaders to re-open peace negotiations. As such with the war all but over the ACH set up camp along the Klerksdorp–Ventersdorp blockhouse line, and although they continued to send out patrols they had little to do but await the inevitable peace. Despite seeing limited combat, Australian conduct in the field was considered to have been of a high standard, both in terms of military efficiency and discipline. Indeed, the ACH showed a level of professionalism perhaps unseen in previous Australian contingents.

Negotiations continued, with the Boer leaders again meeting their British counterparts at Vereeniging, between Pretoria and Kroonstad. Meanwhile, at Elandsfontein the second contingent of the ACH was concentrating after having landed at Durban in late April. Elements of the third contingent sailed aboard the transport Manhattan, departing Australia in late April, and arriving early the following month, while others followed later in May aboard the Manchester Merchant, Custodian, Columbian and St Andrew. They would arrive too late to see combat, though, as on 31 May the Treaty of Vereeniging was signed and the war came to an end, even while elements of the third contingent of the ACH remained at sea, bound for South Africa.

=== Return to Australia, August 1902 ===
Although many men remained in South Africa to start a new life after discharge, the bulk of the contingents began to return to Australia by ship between July and August 1902. Misfortune followed them however, and when the SS Drayton Grange arrived in Melbourne on 7 August with 2,043 troops aboard, five men were already dead from measles and influenza, while another 12 died within weeks. Neglect and unsanitary living conditions aboard the vessel were found to be to blame for the deaths, following a Royal Commission into the matter.

== Battle honours ==
- Nil.

== Decorations ==
- Nil.

== Casualties ==
- 28 died (from illness).
