= Tanks in the Australian Army =

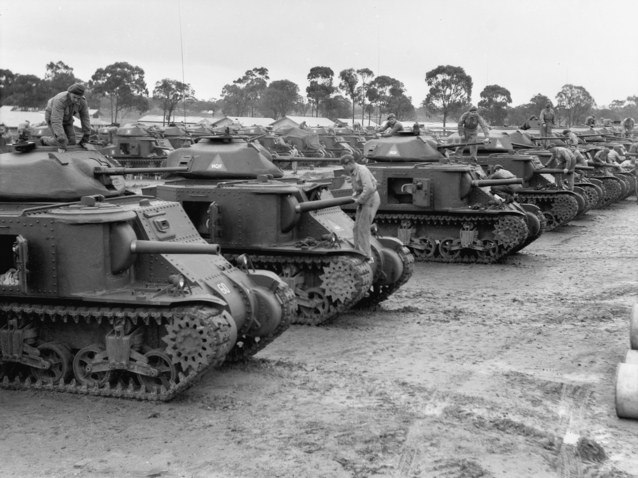
1st Armoured Division M3 Grant tanks in June 1942

The Australian Army has used tanks from after the First World War, through the interwar period, the Second World War, the Cold War and to the present day. Throughout this period the Army has primarily been a light infantry force, with its tanks mainly being used in the direct support role. The Australian Army's tanks have seen combat during the Second World War and the Vietnam War, where they proved successful despite some of the designs employed being considered obsolete. The first Australian tanks were a small number of British medium and light tanks which were operated mainly for training purposes during the 1920s and 1930s.

The outbreak of the Second World War in 1939 led to a significant expansion of Australia's armoured force. From 1942 large numbers of American light and medium tanks were delivered to Australia, along with British Matilda IIs. In addition, a small number of Australian-designed Sentinel tanks were delivered to the Army during 1942 and 1943, but the type was never issued to combat units. Three armoured divisions capable of independent operations were formed during the Second World War, but none were deployed outside Australia. Many individual units later fought against the Japanese in the Pacific, although only in regimental strength.

With few modern tanks at the time of the Korean War, the Australian Army had to rely on British and US tank support. During the 1950s the Army standardised on the British Centurion tank, which saw action in Vietnam and remained in service until it was replaced with the German Leopard 1 in the mid-1970s. After an internal debate on whether the Army should continue to operate tanks as part of its force structure, the Australian Government replaced the Leopards with 59 American M1A1 Abrams tanks in 2007. The Australian Government is currently replacing the M1A1 to the upgraded M1A2 SEPv3 variant of the M1 Abrams. In addition to these types, the Army has operated small numbers of other tank designs for training and evaluation purposes.

== Overview ==
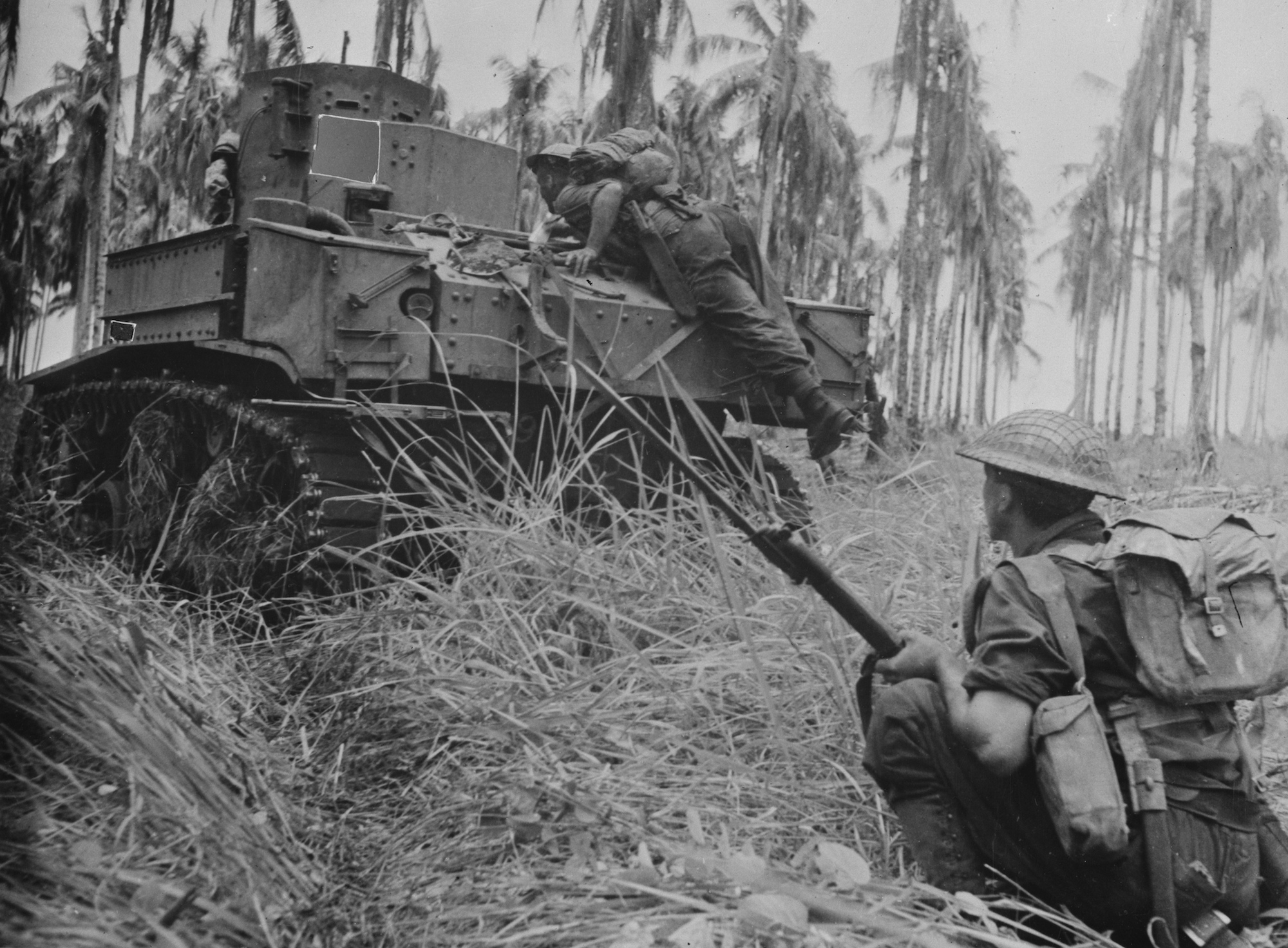
An Australian Light Tank M3 Stuart I during the final assault on Buna.

The operational use of tanks during the latter part of the First World War established the validity of the tank concept. After the war, many nations recognised the importance of tanks, but only a few had the industrial resources to design and build them. During and after the First World War, Britain and France were the intellectual leaders in tank design, while other countries generally followed, adopting their designs. The Australian Army, which had initially had bad experiences operating with British tanks during the early stages of their employment during the war, had come to realise their utility after the battles of 1918, and in the post-war period sought to build its own armoured force.

Initially, the Australian Army procured a number of British-made Vickers tanks, and American M3 Grant medium and M3 Stuart light tanks, but it later went on to build and design some of its own during the Second World War. Since then Australia's armoured forces have fought in a number of battles during key conflicts, such as those in the Second World War and the Vietnam War. Primarily a light infantry force for most of its history, the Australian Army has used tanks mainly in the direct support role as opposed to engaging in sweeping manoeuvre against other tanks.

== Inter-war period ==
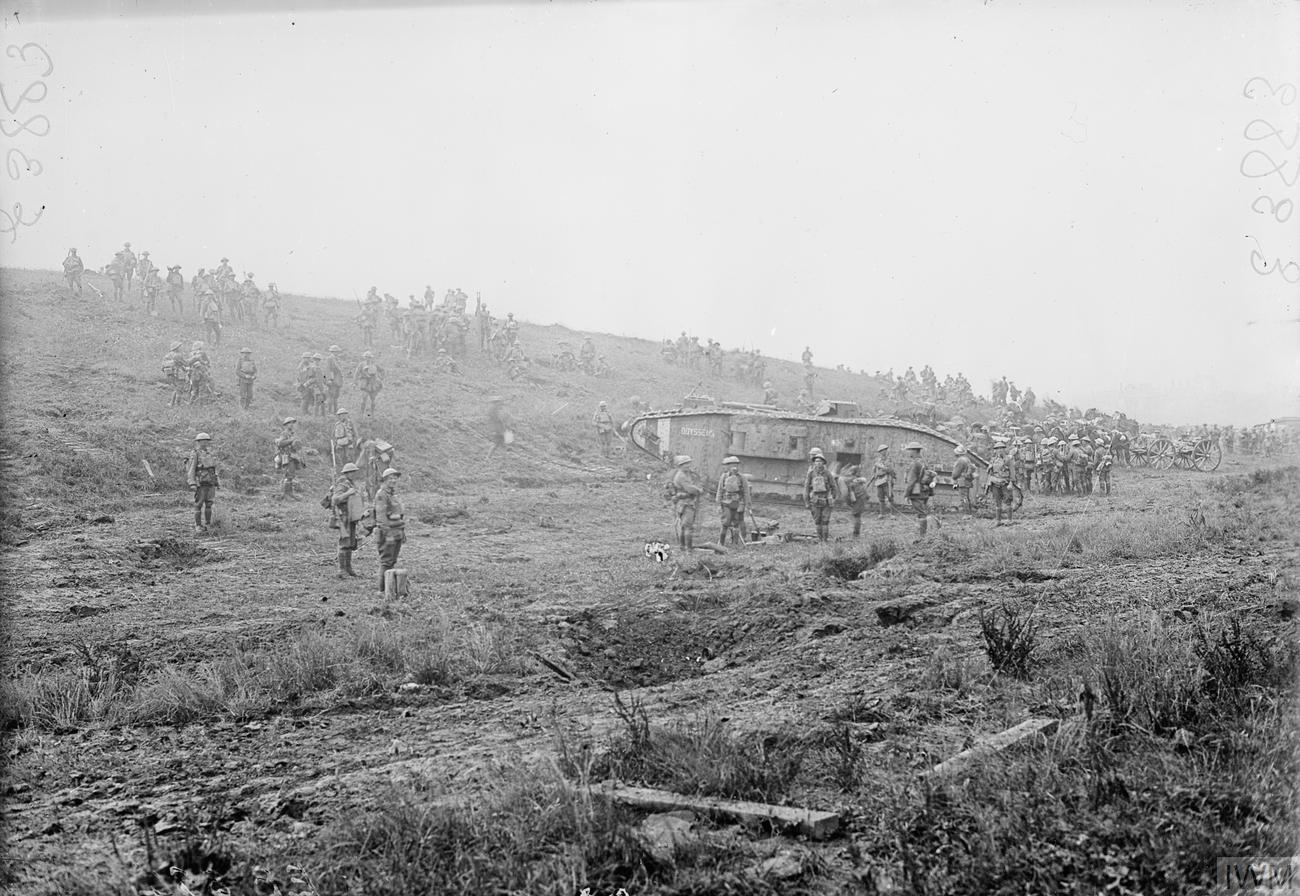
Australian troops operate with a British tank during World War I. Tactics involving large numbers of tanks played a role in the success of the 1918 Allied counter-offensives.

After the First World War, many European countries attempted to mechanise their cavalry. In parallel, Australian cavalry also shifted to military armoured units. The Australian Army (like the US, French, British and Russian armies) tried various methods to integrate modern armour into their traditional horse cavalry formations, as part of a gradual process of mechanisation between 1920 and 1940. Experiences during the final year of the war, such as the Battle of Hamel in July 1918 and later during the Battle of Amiens in August where the Australians had fought as part of an attack by 10 Allied divisions—including Canadian, British and French forces—supported by more than 500 British tanks, had shown the impact that tanks could have on the battlefield. (Note: No tank units were formed as part of the Australian Imperial Force (AIF) raised for overseas service during the First World War. One small armoured unit was raised, the 1st Armoured Car Section. Formed in Australia, it fought in the Western Desert, and then, re-equipped with T Model Fords, served in Palestine as the 1st Light Car Patrol. In March 1918, the British War Office had offered to provide all necessary equipment to the Australians to form their own tank battalion; however, this was turned down by General William Birdwood due to a lack of manpower.)

As a result, the Australian Army sought to obtain tanks of its own; however, due to post-war economic measures this was slow in occurring. Four British Vickers Medium Mark II tanks were procured in 1927 to build its force, with the formation of the Australian Tank Corps gazetted on 15 December 1927. The 1st Tank Section was subsequently formed as a part-time Militia unit in 1930. The unit was based at Randwick, New South Wales, and training was initially undertaken at Greenhills, which was part of the Liverpool Military Area, in Sydney.

Despite these initial developments the Depression in the early 1930s largely halted the development of armour in Australia, although a limited capability was maintained by the regular tank cadre which operated mainly in an instructional role. The 1st Tank Section was disbanded in November 1937 with the men and equipment transferred to the newly created 1st Light Tank Company based at Randwick. It was not the Australian Army's only armoured unit as the Second World War approached. The 2nd Light Tank Company was formed as a Militia unit at Caulfield, Victoria in March 1939 and was also equipped with Vickers Medium Mark II medium tanks. The light tank companies were then equipped with the Light Tank Mark VIa, 10 of which had been acquired to replace the ageing Mark IIs. In addition, the 1st Royal New South Wales Lancers, which had been serving as a Light Horse regiment, having converted from horses to armoured vehicles to become a light cavalry (reconnaissance) regiment and took on the role of a motorised machine-gun regiment during the inter-war years. It subsequently saw action in the Second World War as the 1st Armoured Regiment equipped with Matilda infantry tanks.

== Second World War ==
=== Armoured formations and campaigns ===
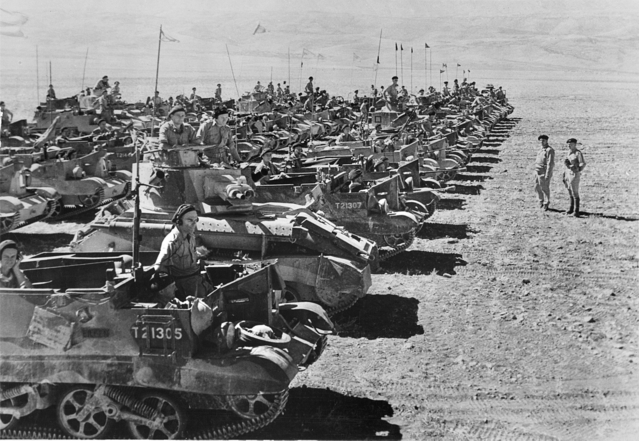
Vickers Light Tanks and Universal Carriers of the 9th Divisional Cavalry Regiment in Syria in 1941.

M3 Grant tanks, Armoured division, Puckapunyal Army Base, Victoria, Australia, 1942

The outbreak of war in 1939 led to a significant expansion of Australia's armoured force. At the start of the war, due to the limitations of the Defence Act (1903), which prevented the government from sending the Militia to fight outside Australian territory, it was decided to raise an all-volunteer force to serve overseas. This force was known as the Second Australian Imperial Force (2nd AIF), and many of the 1st Light Horse (Machine Gun) Regiment's members volunteered and were assigned to the 2/2nd Machine Gun Battalion, they took part in the fighting in the Mediterranean theatre. With the Australian Army only possessing a total of fourteen tanks – 10 Mark VIs and four Mark IIs – orders for modern types were quickly placed in Britain and the United States.

Thirteen M3 light tanks arrived in September 1941, while another 400 more were soon delivered. However, 140 British Matilda tanks would not begin to arrive until July 1942. Meanwhile, as steps were made to form the 1st Armoured Division in 1941 the armoured vehicles of the 1st and 2nd Light Tank Companies had been withdrawn to equip the newly formed AFV School at Puckapunyal, Victoria. The 1st Light Tank Company was subsequently expanded to form the 3rd Armoured Regiment, while the 2nd Light Tank Company was disbanded.

At the same time each of the four divisions in the 2nd AIF was authorised a cavalry reconnaissance regiment equipped with light tanks and scout carriers. While all four divisions were authorised a divisional cavalry regiment, only three regiments were eventually formed as it was believed that the 8th Division did not need armoured support in Malaya due to concerns about operating tanks in the jungle. The cavalry regiments of the 2nd AIF divisions operating in Mediterranean theatre against Italian and German forces were initially equipped with the Universal Carrier and unarmoured trucks before being progressively mechanised using British Army equipment, while carriers were also operated by the infantry battalions. A light armoured tracked vehicle they were armed with Bren light machine guns and Boys anti-tank rifles and were widely used by British Commonwealth forces during World War II. Meanwhile, the Australian Tank Corps was superseded following the formation of the Australian Armoured Corps in July 1941. In October 1941 two independent light tank squadrons had been formed for service in Malaya; however, neither was deployed due to a lack of vehicles to equip them.

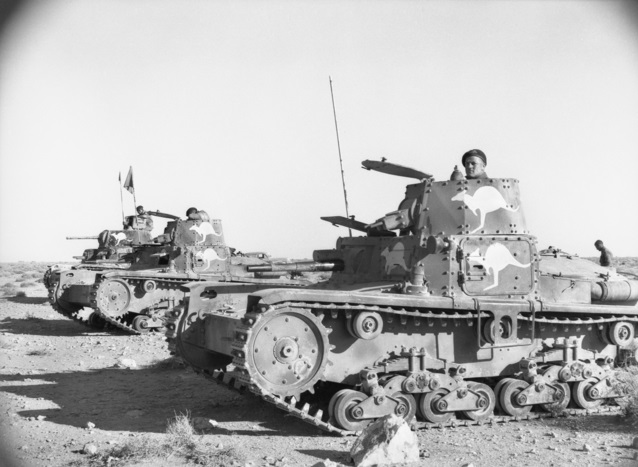
Captured Italian M13/40 and M11/39 tanks at Tobruk with Australian markings, January 1941.

In North Africa in 1941, Australian troops were part of the force which captured Tobruk on 22 January as part of Operation Compass, yielding over 25,000 prisoners along with 236 field and medium guns, 23 medium tanks and more than 200 other vehicles. During the capture of the town Australians from the 6th Division Cavalry Regiment had used a number of captured Italian M11 tanks which had been pressed into service due to a lack of their own tanks, painting kangaroos on the side so they would not be attacked by their own side. The regiment's use of tanks in this fighting was significant, representing the first time that Australian forces had operated tanks in action. The 6th Division Cavalry Regiment later saw service in Syria against the Vichy French. Meanwhile, the 7th Division Cavalry Regiment had been sent to Cyprus in May 1941, before relieving the 6th Division Cavalry Regiment in July.

The regiment subsequently fought a number of actions using a variety of armoured personnel carriers, light tanks, and 2-pounder anti-tank guns before returning to Australia in March 1942. The 9th Division Cavalry Regiment later also served in Syria and was the first Australian armoured unit to be equipped with modern vehicles, receiving British Crusader Mark II medium tanks and M3 Stuart light tanks. A number of captured French Renault R35 tanks were also used. The regiment returned to Australia in early 1943. Between mid-1942 and early 1944 the Divisional Cavalry Regiments were converted to commando units and subsequently fought in the Pacific against the Japanese as dismounted infantry.

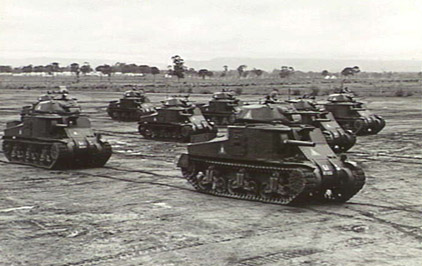
M3 Grants of the 1st Armoured Division at Puckapunyal, June 1942

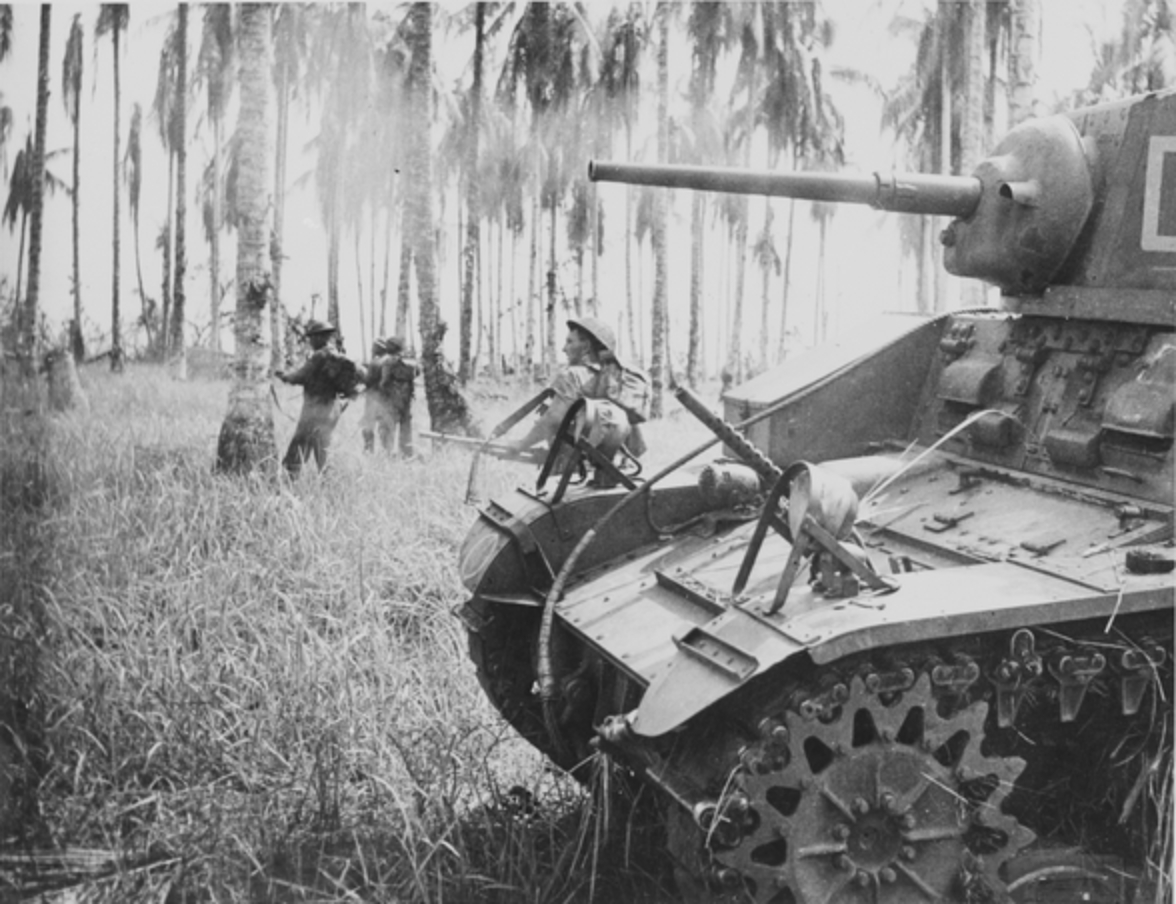
A 2/6th Armoured Regiment M3 Stuart light tank supporting infantry during the assault on Buna

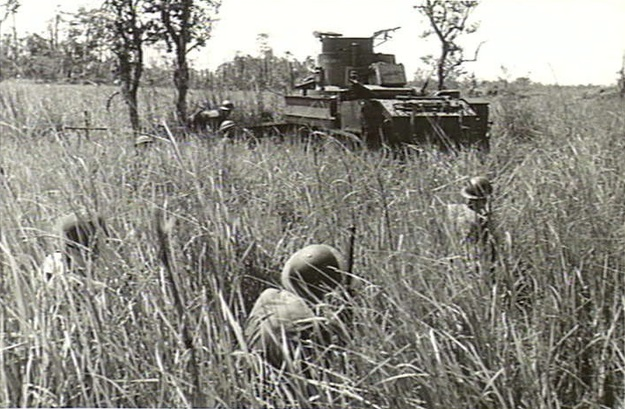
Australian troops crouch behind an M3 Stuart light tank as they wait to advance during the clearing out of pillboxes on Buna.

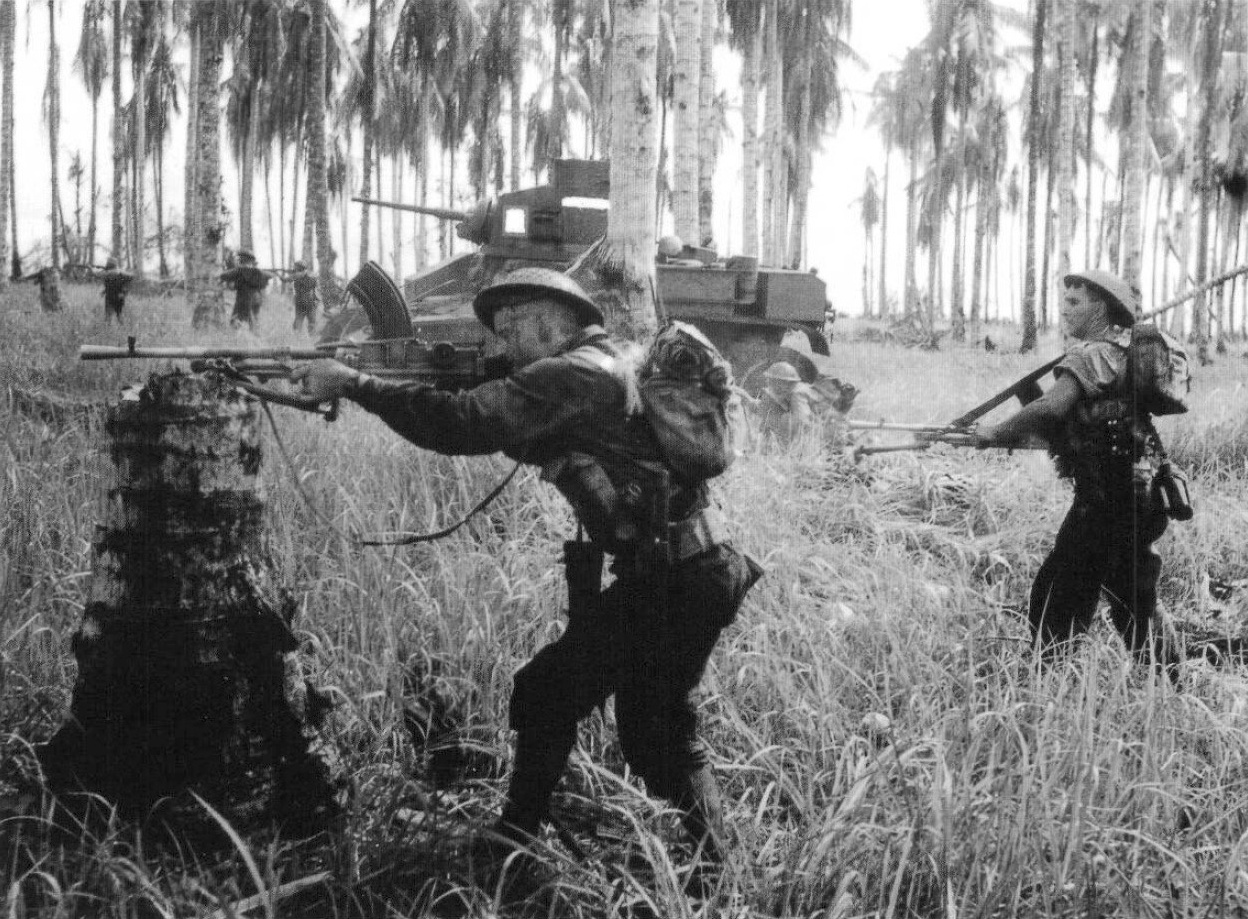
Australian assault on a pillbox with a M3 Stuart tank at Giropa Point, during the assault on Buna

The Australian 1st Armoured Division was raised in 1941 as part of the 2nd AIF. While the division was originally to be deployed to North Africa in late 1941, it was retained in Australia following the outbreak of the Pacific War. Universal Carriers were issued to the armoured regiments in 1941 and early 1942 for training purposes and to provide the Army with a minimal armoured capability as an emergency measure until the arrival of tanks ordered from the United States. The 1st Armoured Division's armoured regiments subsequently began re-equipping with M3 Grant medium tanks and M3 Stuart light tanks in April and May 1942. Following this, the division was concentrated in northern New South Wales where it completed its training with a series of large exercises around Narrabri.

The 2/6th Armoured Regiment was the first unit of the division to see action, deploying to Port Moresby and Milne Bay in New Guinea in September. In December two of its squadrons were subsequently shipped to Buna on the north coast of Papua to help break the deadlock in the Battle of Buna–Gona and although the lightly armoured M3 Stuart tanks proved to be unsuited to jungle warfare and suffered heavy casualties, the regiment played an important role in the eventual Australian victory at Buna during fighting between December 1942 and January 1943. Meanwhile, in January 1943 the remainder of the division was moved to the area between Perth and Geraldton, Western Australia, where it formed part of III Corps, which was tasked to counter the perceived threat of a Japanese invasion of Western Australia. The 1st Armoured Division formed a key element of Australia's mainland defences, but after that threat passed it was disbanded in Western Australia in September 1943.

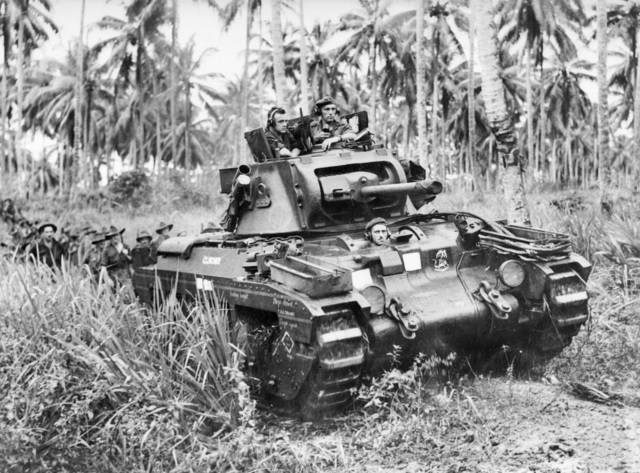
A Matilda tank, named "Clincher", moves towards Japanese strong points near Finschhafen, in north-eastern Papua New Guinea in 1943

The 1st Light Horse (Machine Gun) Regiment (Royal New South Wales Lancers) was renamed the 1st Machine Gun Regiment in December 1941. In March 1942, the regiment was again renamed, being converted to the 1st Motor Regiment. This change was short lived however, and it was changed again in May to the 1st Tank Battalion, becoming part of the Australian 3rd Army Tank Brigade, equipped with Matilda tanks. In 1943 the unit became part of the 4th Armoured Brigade and was designated as an AIF unit, thus allowing it to be deployed to any theatre of the conflict, and it deployed to New Guinea in August 1943 and fought against the Japanese in the Battles of Sattelberg and Lakona. The unit was then withdrawn to Australia in mid-1944. On 1 June 1944, the unit was renamed the 1st Armoured Regiment, and in May 1945, it took part in the amphibious landings at Balikpapan in support of the 7th Division, being involved in one of the final Australian campaigns of the war in Borneo.

The Australian 2nd Armoured Division was established on 21 February 1942 by redesignating and reorganising the 2nd Motor Division (which was previously the 2nd Cavalry Division). As an armoured division, it consisted of one armoured brigade of three armoured regiments, and one motor brigade consisting of three motor regiments, supported by an armoured car regiment. It was equipped with M3 Grant medium tanks and M3 Stuart light tanks. The 2nd Armoured Division was disbanded in Queensland on 19 February 1943. Similarly, the Australian 3rd Armoured Division was established on 15 November 1942 by redesignating the 1st Motor Division (which was previously the 1st Cavalry Division). As an armoured division the 3rd Armoured was equipped with M3 Grant medium tanks and M3 Stuart light tanks. The division's 3rd Motor Brigade was gradually disbanded between March and August 1943 and the 3rd Armoured Division was disbanded in Queensland on 19 October 1943 as a result of manpower shortages in the Australian Army.

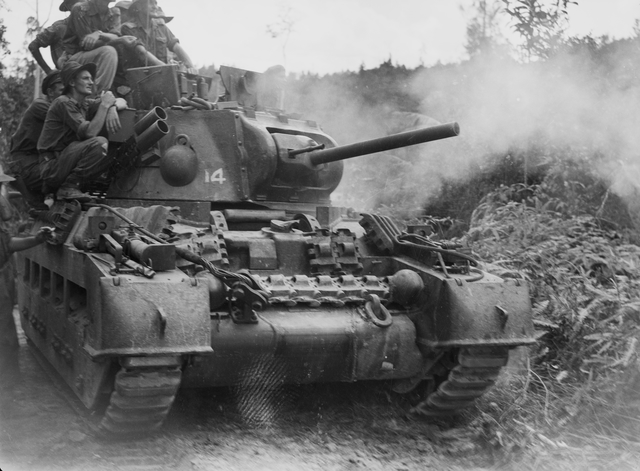
A 2/9th Armoured Regiment Matilda II firing its three-inch howitzer at Japanese positions during the Battle of Tarakan

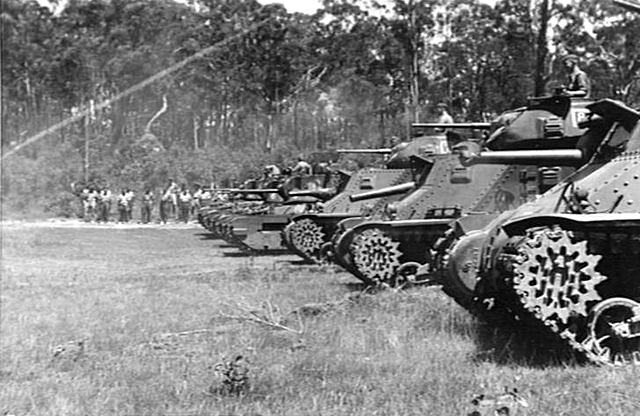
M3 Grant tanks of the 4th Armoured Brigade

The Australian 4th Armoured Brigade was formed in January 1943 to provide armoured support for Australian Army units operating in the South West Pacific Area. The brigade was never intended to serve as a single formation, rather its role was to provide a pool of armoured units from which units and sub-units could be provided to augment infantry forces. The brigade was also responsible for developing doctrine and specialised armoured vehicles for armoured warfare in tropical terrain. In keeping with the brigade's task of providing armoured units to other formations, its armoured regiments were organised into self-supporting regimental groups and the brigade did not possess the reconnaissance, infantry and other supporting elements which were common in World War II-era armoured brigades. Elements of the brigade saw action in the Huon Peninsula campaign of 1943–44 and attached to the Australian 6th Division during the Aitape–Wewak campaign from October 1944 until the end of the war.

Australian tanks also played a role in the Borneo Campaign in 1945. In a series of amphibious assaults between 1 May and 21 July, the Australian I Corps, under Lieutenant General Leslie Morshead, attacked Japanese forces occupying the island. The Matilda tanks of C Squadron, 2/9th Armoured Regiment were attached to the 26th Brigade Group during the campaign which opened with Oboe 1, with a landing on the small island of Tarakan, off the north east coast on 1 May 1945, with the fighting continuing into June with the tanks taking part in the advance along the Anzac and Bourke Highways, helping to secure the airfield and the oilfields. This was followed by Oboe 6, in which the remainder of the 2/9th Armoured Regiment was attached to the 9th Division, on 10 June 1945 with simultaneous assaults on the island of Labuan and the coast of Brunei, in the north west of Borneo. B Squadron took part in the landing at Labuan supporting the 24th Brigade's advance, assisting in the capture of the airfield, and various positions along the MacArthur Road. At the same time, A Squadron landed on the Borneo peninsula, securing the town before being used in a defensive role due to the impenetrable terrain further inland, which was only passable on foot.

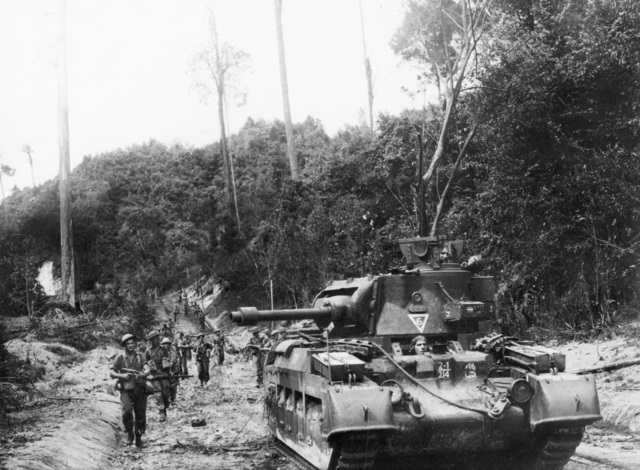
An Australian Matilda Frog flamethrower tank in Borneo, 1945.

A week later, the Australians followed up with attacks on Japanese positions around Weston on the north-eastern part of Brunei Bay. The 1st Armoured Regiment and Armoured Squadron (Special Equipment) operating Matilda II tanks were attached to the Australian 7th Division and took part in the Battle of Balikpapan which was the concluding stage of the Operation Oboe. The landings took place on 1 July 1945 and had been preceded by heavy bombing and shelling by Australian and US air and naval forces. Landing with the infantry, the tanks—including Matilda tank dozers, newly modified Matilda Frog flamethrower tanks, and a Coventanter bridge-layer—mainly operated in small detachments in close support of the troops, even though the terrain offered the opportunity for more mobile tactics to be employed. Although the Australians were ultimately successful, casualties among the infantry were heavy and during this time the regiment was involved in some hard fighting, with the Japanese able to make effective use of strong natural defences in conjunction with minefields and anti-tank ditches to compensate for their lack of anti-tank guns. With the fighting coming to a conclusion however, tank operations ceased on 24 July.

Overall, while the armoured units that were involved in operations overseas acquitted themselves well, despite significant investment in the development of tank forces, they ultimately played a limited role in the Australian war effort. Three armoured divisions capable of independent operations were formed during World War II, but none were deployed outside Australia. Many individual units later fought against the Japanese in the Pacific, although only in regimental strength. Despite initial delays in receiving adequate equipment a considerable force had subsequently been developed, although it was not until late 1942 that the first units saw action in support of the infantry in New Guinea. Yet the need to quickly deploy units following the rapid Japanese advance and the nature of the terrain in the South West Pacific Area in which the bulk of Australian forces would fight meant they were unable to be deployed as a formation.

Meanwhile, as the threat of invasion passed the need for large armoured formations had lessened, and the divisions had been broken up between mid-1943 and 1944 with only one operational brigade remaining by the end of the war. However, despite using tanks that were obsolete by the standards of the war in Europe the contribution of the Australian Armoured Corps to the success of later campaigns was significant, lessening casualties among the infantry and demonstrating the role of tanks in jungle operations. The Matilda proved the most successful tank used in jungle fighting by the Australian Army, achieving immediate success following its deployment to New Guinea in 1943 due to its heavy armour, manoeuvrability in close terrain, and the effectiveness of its 2-pounder against Japanese bunkers. This was possible due to the limited number of effective antitank weapons deployed by the Japanese in the areas where the Matilda was used, while the terrain was conducive to it being operated alongside infantry—in the role for which the Matilda had originally been designed.

=== Australian tank program and development ===
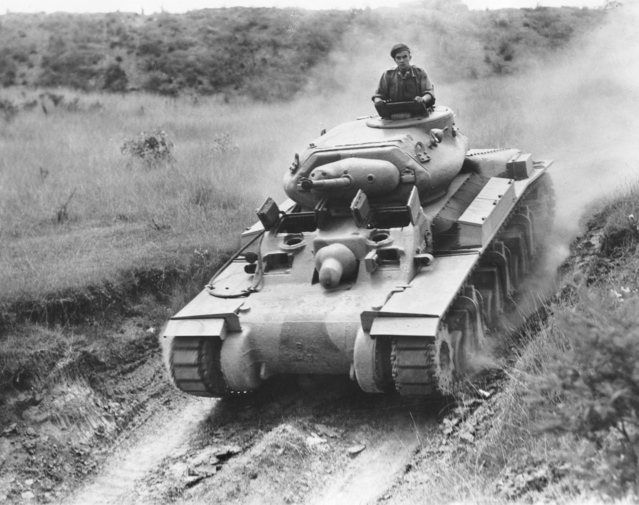
A production AC1 AC MkI Sentinel tank on trials

Following Germany's success in Europe with the Fall of France in 1940 the United Kingdom was unable to spare tank production for Australia, and as a result a program to produce tanks in Australia to equip forces in the Middle East was initiated. Concern about the likely entry of Japan into the war and the threat it would pose to vital sea lanes, as well as the possibility of an invasion of the Australian mainland, also provided impetus for local manufacture. The Australian tank program developed and produced two tank designs, a cruiser tank called the Sentinel, and the Thunderbolt. An order was made to build a total of 200 Thunderbolt tanks, and after the pilot model AC3 had been completed, large scale production began. The New South Wales Government Railways' production line at Chullora had started assembling the first 25 AC3 tanks for trials when the programme was terminated in July 1943.

The Sentinel was the only tank to be produced in quantity in Australia. The few Sentinels that were built never saw action as Australia's armoured divisions had been equipped by that time with British and American tanks. Due to a lack of experience in tank design a mission was sent to the US to examine the M3 design and a British officer with many years tank design experience was provided by the United Kingdom. The design used existing parts where available from the M3, simplified where necessary to match the machining capacity present in Australia. The hull was cast as a single piece, as was the turret; a technique not used on the hull of any other tanks of the era.

Japan's entry into the war in late 1941 stopped plans for the deployment of Australian armour to the Middle East. By the beginning of 1943 the Australian Armoured Corps was at its peak with 1,460 tanks on strength, the majority of them Matildas and light and medium M3s. (Note: This strength comprised 304 Matilda IIs, 260 M3 Stuart light tanks, 757 M3 Grant medium tanks, 138 Marmon-Herrington two-man tanks and four Australian Cruiser Mark I (AC1)s.) Meanwhile, 65 production AC1 vehicles and one AC3 had been completed by June 1943. That year, the 3rd Army Tank Battalion was equipped with a squadron of AC1 tanks, which were modified to resemble German tanks and used in the filming of the movie, The Rats of Tobruk. This appears to have been the only time a squadron of Sentinels was used for any purpose. Nevertheless, the completed Sentinel tanks were used for evaluation purposes only and were not issued to operational armoured units, as the Australian Cruiser tank program was terminated in July 1943. By this time the Japanese threat had lessened, and US and British-made M3 Grant and Matilda tanks were being supplied to Australia from the Middle East, and it was felt that Australia's manufacturing resources would be better spent on railway locomotive production.

Experience during operations later led to the development of specialised armoured equipment by Australian industry for use in jungle operations in the South West Pacific Area. A range of modifications were subsequently developed for the Matilda, including the fitting of wire mesh screens or metal tracking over the engine and air louvres to protect it against magnetic mines, an armoured shield on top of the hull to protect the turret ring, a microphone and headset attached to the rear to act as a telephone for infantry co-operation, waterproofing equipment for deep wading, a tank dozer, a flamethrowing tank called the Matilda Frog, and one capable of firing a salvo of naval mortar bombs, known as the Matilda Hedgehog.

The Frog was capable of projecting a flame 80 to 100 m (260 to 330 ft), while the Hedgehog, an adaption of the anti-submarine mortar of the same name was designed to fire multiple projectiles at concrete blockhouses. Used in combat in the final year of the war in support of Australian infantry at Balipapan, the Frog proved a successful adaptation. Trials were also undertaken to fit air conditioning to the Matildas to improve the endurance of crews in tropical conditions. Limited modifications were also undertaken on the M3 Grant medium tanks, including the fitting of a small number of dozer variants and trials to waterproof the vehicles for wading.

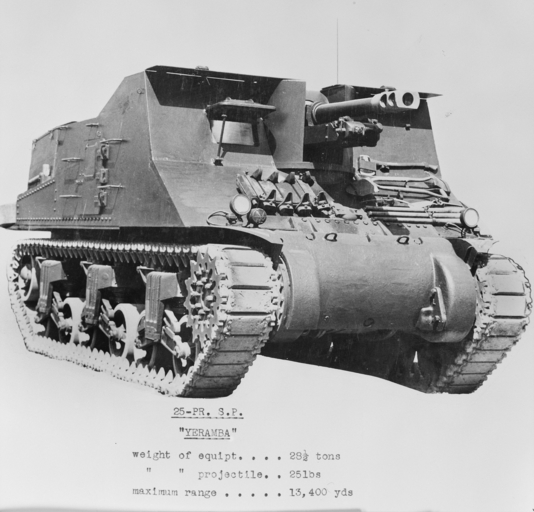
Yeramba self-propelled 25 Pounder

The Yeramba self-propelled howitzer was also developed in Australia following the Second World War. Built by mounting the 25-pounder gun howitzer on an American M3A5 Grant tank hull, in a similar manner to the wartime Canadian-built Sexton (25-pdr on a derivative of the M3 chassis), the Yeramba remains the only self-propelled artillery to have been used by the Australian Army.

== Post-1945 ==
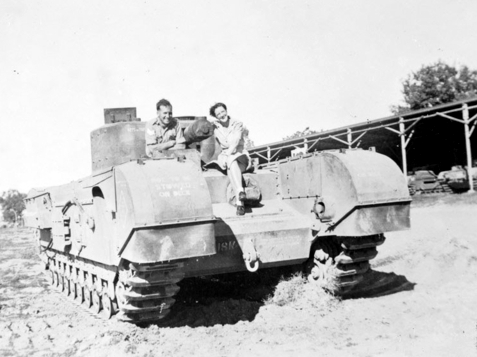
An Australian Army Churchill Mark VII tank photographed between 1945 and 1947

Following the end of the Second World War the Australian Army was demobilised and the 1st Armoured Regiment was reconstituted as a reserve formation in the Citizen Military Forces (CMF) on 1 April 1948, adopting the designation of the 1st Armoured Regiment (Royal New South Wales Lancers), in recognition of its previous history. During this time the regiment continued to operate Matilda tanks and was based at Lancer Barracks in Parramatta, in New South Wales. However, in 1949 the regiment was renamed the 1st Royal New South Wales Lancers and its battle honours and history were perpetuated by this unit, to reallocate the former name to the tank regiment that was to be established in the new Australian Regular Army. (Note: See 1st Armoured Regiment.)

The 1st Armoured Regiment was formed as a tank unit in the new Australian Regular Army on 7 July 1949. Initially, the new regiment was equipped with Churchill tanks, (Note: Over 500 had Churchills had been ordered in early 1945; however, this figure was progressively reduced as the strategic situation improved and was eventually limited to 51 which were delivered following the end of the war.) although this was only a temporary measure until Centurion tanks could be acquired. However, due to the perceived unsuitability of the Churchill and the late arrival of the new platform, the regiment was not deployed as part of Australia's commitment to the Korean War, although a number of officers served on exchange with British and US formations and the unit provided machine-gunners and signallers to Australian infantry battalions as reinforcements. Meanwhile, the infantry had to rely on US and British tanks for armoured support. The first Centurions finally began arriving in June 1952, with the regiment receiving 39 tanks. By this time though British and Canadian armoured units were operating in sufficient strength in Korea and there was no scope for the deployment of Australian forces.

A number of other CMF units operated M3 Grant medium tanks in the immediate post–war period, including the 8th/13th Victorian Mounted Rifles (8th/13th VMR) and the 4th/19th Prince of Wales's Light Horse (4th/19th PWLH), before converting to Centurions. Meanwhile, the last of the Matildas were withdrawn from service with the CMF in 1955. Later, in 1956 the 1st Royal New South Wales Lancers merged with the 15th Northern River Lancers to form the 1st/15th Royal New South Wales Lancers (1st/15th RNSWL), which was also equipped with a small number of Centurion tanks. The CMF armoured units were rationalised in 1957 and consequently the change to the pentropic structure in the 1960s mostly resulted in a change in role only, with the 4th/19th PWLH changing from an armoured unit to a reconnaissance regiment. However, the two CMF armoured brigade headquarters were disbanded. Following additional orders, a total of 127 Centurions had been acquired by 1961, including 117 tanks, four bridgelayers and six Armoured Recovery Vehicles.

== Vietnam War ==
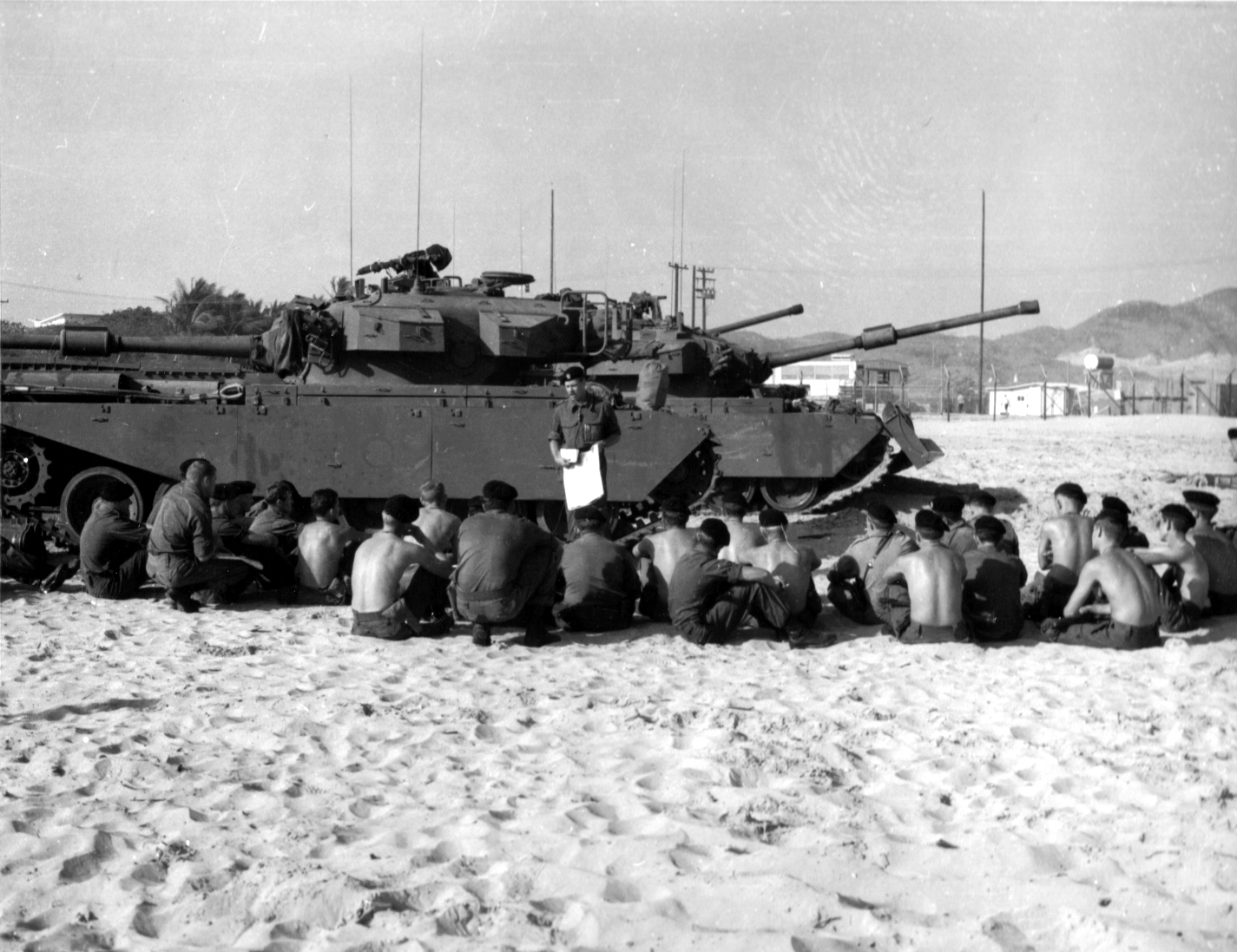
Soldiers of the 1st Armoured Regiment are briefed while sitting in front of their Centurion tanks at Vung Tau in South Vietnam during 1968

In May 1965 the 1st Battalion, Royal Australian Regiment had been deployed on active service to South Vietnam, with armoured mobility support initially provided by 1 Troop, A Squadron, 4th/19th Prince of Wales Light Horse equipped with the new M113A1 Armoured Personnel Carrier. The Australian government subsequently increased its commitment to a two-battalion brigade, known as the 1st Australian Task Force (1 ATF), in March 1966. Based at Nui Dat in Phuoc Tuy Province the force included an APC squadron but no tanks. However, in October 1967 it was announced that 1 ATF would be expanded to three infantry battalions, while additional supporting arms, including a tank squadron, would also be added to the force. As such in February 1968, C Squadron, 1st Armoured Regiment was sent to Vietnam, with a total strength of 20 Centurion tanks. However, two of the four tank troops were initially held back until the Centurions had proved themselves capable of operating in the conditions. The tank squadron reached full strength on 5 September 1968.

Over the next four years all three of the regiment's operational squadrons eventually served in Vietnam, providing invaluable close support to the infantry, particularly during the clearance of Viet Cong bunker systems. Although their value in Vietnam was originally questioned by some, they proved a powerful weapon in both offence and defence, and were responsible for limiting infantry casualties. The Centurions were able to move through the countryside more easily than expected and although they were vulnerable to anti-tank weapons and mines, their firepower and shock action had a decisive effect on the battlefield. The tanks played a significant role in the Battle of Coral–Balmoral in May and June 1968.

In February 1969, C Squadron was relieved by B Squadron. On 6–7 June, B Squadron was involved in a fierce action during the Battle of Binh Ba, a village 5 kilometres (3.1 mi) north of Nui Dat. One Australian was killed and 10 wounded, while Viet Cong and North Vietnamese losses included at least 107 killed, six wounded and eight captured. By late-1970 Australia was beginning to reduce its commitment to the war and the size of 1ATF was again reduced from three infantry battalions to two. The tanks, however, continued operations and were involved in heavy fighting at Long Khanh on 6–7 June 1971, as well as numerous smaller actions. The last elements of the regiment were subsequently withdrawn from Vietnam in September 1971. A total of 58 Centurions had served in Vietnam; 42 had suffered battle damage, of which six were beyond repair, while two crewmen had been killed in action.

== Post Cold War to the present ==
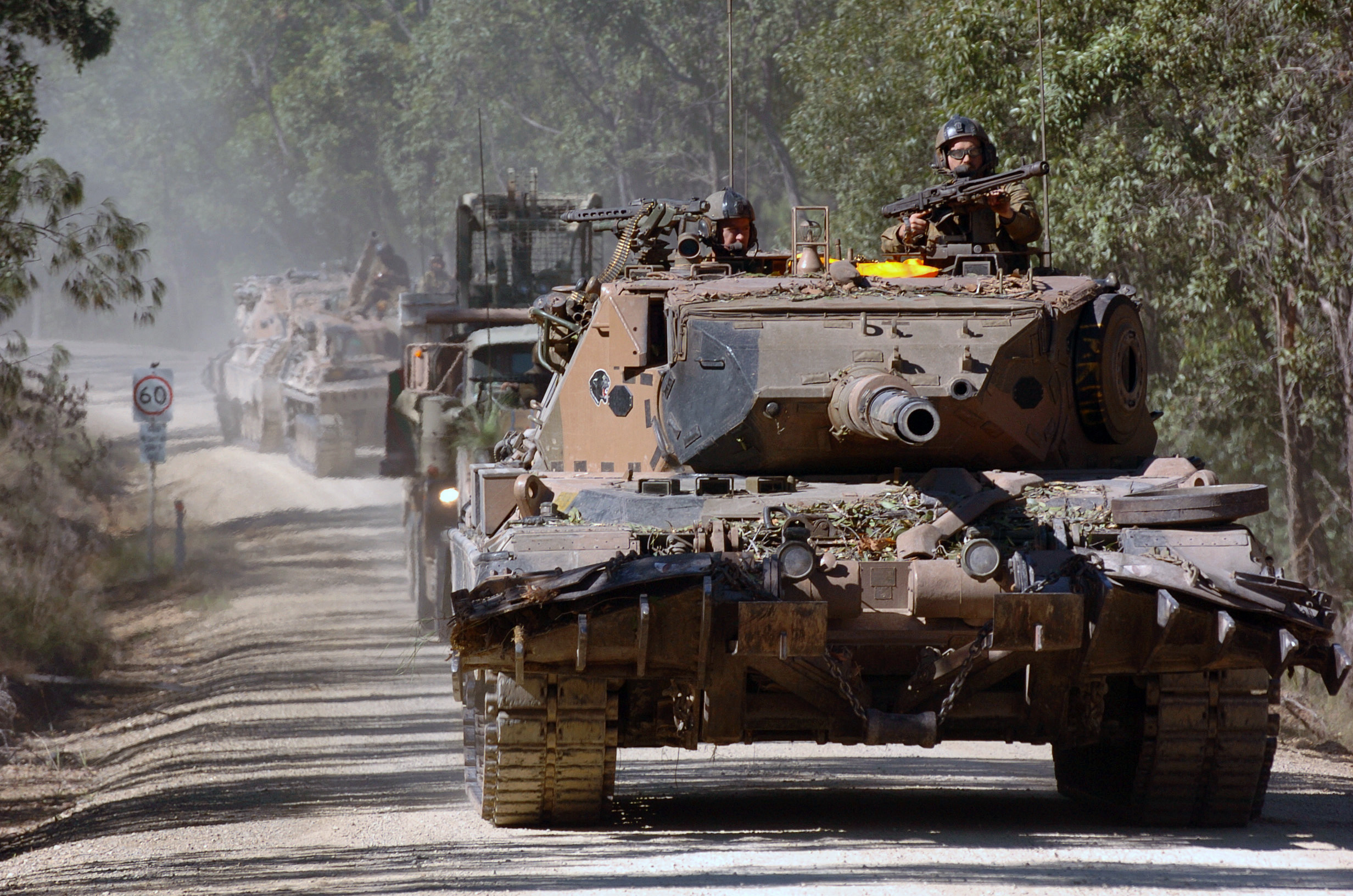
A Leopard AS1 of the 1st Armoured Regiment during an exercise in Queensland in 2005.

There were changes for the 1st Armoured Regiment, and for the Australian Army, with the abolition of National Service after the end of Australian involvement in Vietnam depleting its strength to the point where training was severely restricted until it was reinforced during 1974. Meanwhile, the reserve 1st/15th RNSWL and 8th/13th VMR had both continued to operate a small number of Centurions in the early 1970s; however, they were both later re-roled and equipped with M113s, while the later was eventually disbanded. (Note: The 8th/13th VMR was reduced to a single independent squadron in 1976, before being merged with the 4th/19th PWLH in 1992.) The last CMF armoured regiment gave up its tanks in 1971, leaving the regular 1st Armoured Regiment as the only tank unit in the Australian Army. Meanwhile, the Centurions were mechanically worn-out, and although additional vehicles had been acquired from New Zealand and British Army stocks, by 1972 the fleet was in need of replacement. (Note: In 1968, a further seven tanks had been purchased from New Zealand for spare parts, while another 15 were purchased from the British Army in Hong Kong in 1971.)

During 1973, B Squadron, 1st Armoured Regiment—designated the Medium Tank Trials Unit (MTTU)—evaluated the German Leopard 1 against the American M60A1 as a replacement for the obsolete Centurions. The Leopard was judged the superior tank, and 90 gun tanks, eight Leopard 1 Armoured Recovery Vehicles Medium and five Leopard 1 bridge layer tanks were ordered. The Australian tanks were designated the Leopard AS1, and were based on the Leopard 1A3 which had been built for the German Army. The main difference between the Australian and German tanks was the inclusion of a SABCA fire control system, equipment to allow the tank to better operate in the tropics, additional storage boxes on the sides of the tank as well as improved trunnion bearings and combustion cleaners. These tanks were delivered to Australia in batches between 1976 and 1978. During the Leopard's service very little in the way of upgrades were undertaken, and by the 1990s they had become obsolete.

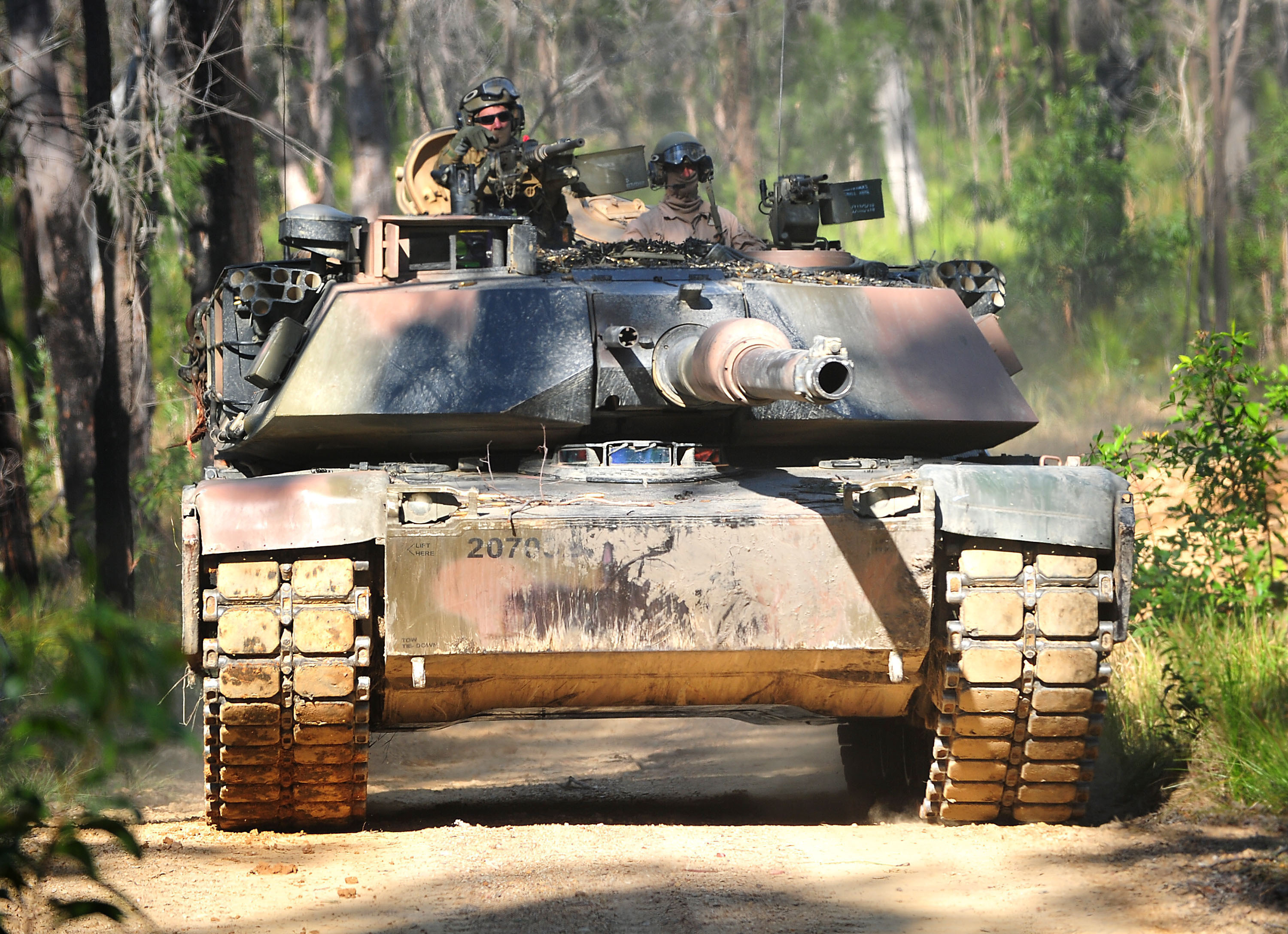
1st Armoured Regiment M1A1 Abrams tank in 2011

After an internal debate on whether the Army should continue to operate tanks as part of its force structure, in 2004 the Australian Government decided to replace the Leopards with a small fleet of American M1A1 Abrams tanks to provide close support for infantry when operating in jungle or urban areas. After 31 years of service the Leopards were subsequently replaced by 59 M1A1 Abrams AIM, which began entering service in 2007. Seven M88A2 Hercules Armoured Recovery Vehicles (ARVs) were also acquired. The Leopards never saw operational service, although during the 1999 East Timor crisis the regiment was placed on standby to deploy in the event the conflict escalated, while it was not deployed during Australia's involvement in the 2003 invasion of Iraq. By this time the Leopards were considered unsuitable for deployment in a high threat environment. As of 2007 the 1st Armoured Regiment, located in Darwin as part of the mechanised 1st Brigade, was the only armoured unit in the Australian Army equipped with main battle tanks, operating the M1A1 Abrams AIM. A small number of M1A1s were also operated by the School of Armour at Puckapunyal for training purposes.

As part of the Plan Beersheba reorganisation, the M1A1 Abrams tanks were split across each the three armoured cavalry regiments assigned to the Army's multirole combat brigades located in Brisbane, Darwin and Townsville. It has been reported that this plan may require the acquisition of an additional 10–12 M1A1 Abrams and six M88A2 Hercules ARVs in order to allow the formation of three tank squadrons. Obstacle breaching and bridgelaying variants may also be acquired at a later date. One of the 1st Armoured Regiment's squadrons was transferred to the Townsville-based 2nd Cavalry Regiment in late 2015, with 14 of the tanks relocating. Another squadron was transferred to 2nd/14th Light Horse Regiment in Brisbane in 2017 to complete this process.

2015-16 Australian Army planning documents envisioned the M1A1 fleet undergoing a number of upgrades similar to those planned by the US Army to improve their "lethality, survivability and supportability" in order to keep them in service until 2035, with the acquisition of additional tanks to enhance "strategic fleet sustainability" and obstacle clearance and breaching provided by vehicles using the same chassis. The Australian Army looked that the optimum fleet size for the M1A1 is 90 tanks, with a range of upgrade and procurement programs currently being planned.

Under Project LAND 907 Phase 2, the Australian Army's tank fleet is to be increased to 75 M1A2 SEPv3 variants of the Abrams. These tanks will be sourced from US Army stocks and be modernised before entering Australian service. In addition, 29 M1150 Assault Breacher Vehicles are to be procured under Project LAND 8160 Phase 1 along with a further six M88A2s and 18 M1074 Joint Assault Bridges. The US Government approved these purchases in April 2021.

In 2025 Australia delivered 49 M1A1s to Ukraine as part of a military aid for the Russo-Ukrainian War.

== List of tanks used by the Australian Army ==
The following tanks have been used by the Australian Army:

- (United Kingdom) Vickers Medium Mark II
- (United Kingdom) Vickers Light Tank Mark VIA
- (United States) M3 Stuart
- (United States) M3 Lee – Grant and Lee variants, some used post-war to 1955, others converted to Yeramba self-propelled artillery
- (United Kingdom) Matilda II
- (Australia) Australian Cruiser Tank Mk1 – Sentinel
- (United States) Sherman Tank – three for trials purposes only
- (United Kingdom) Churchill
- (United Kingdom) Centurion Mk. 5/1 Main Battle Tank
- (Germany) Leopard AS1 Main Battle Tank
- (United States) M1A1 AIM SA Abrams Main Battle Tank
- (United States) M1A2 SEPv3 SA Abrams Main Battle Tank

== Gallery ==
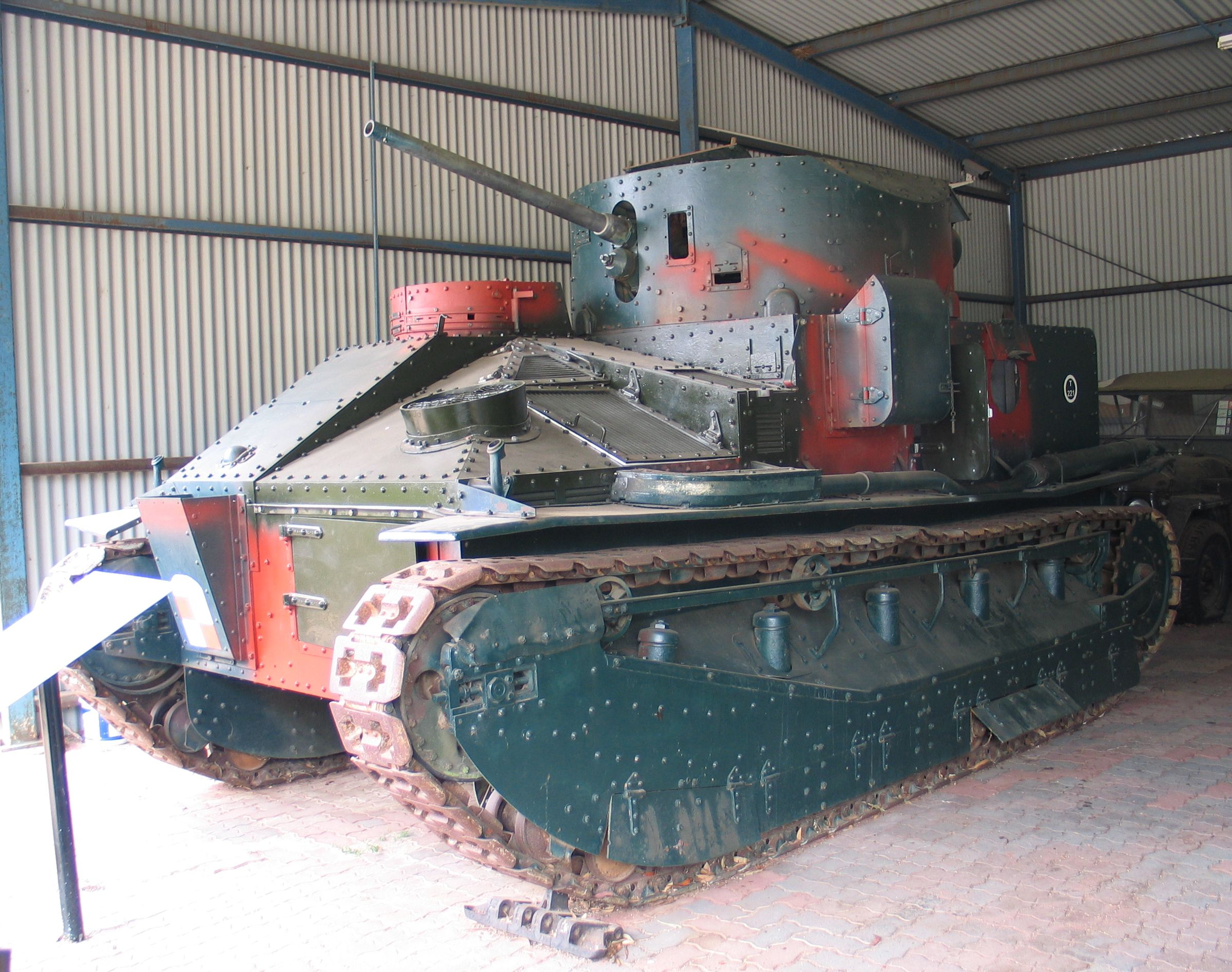
Vickers Medium Tank Mk II (Special)

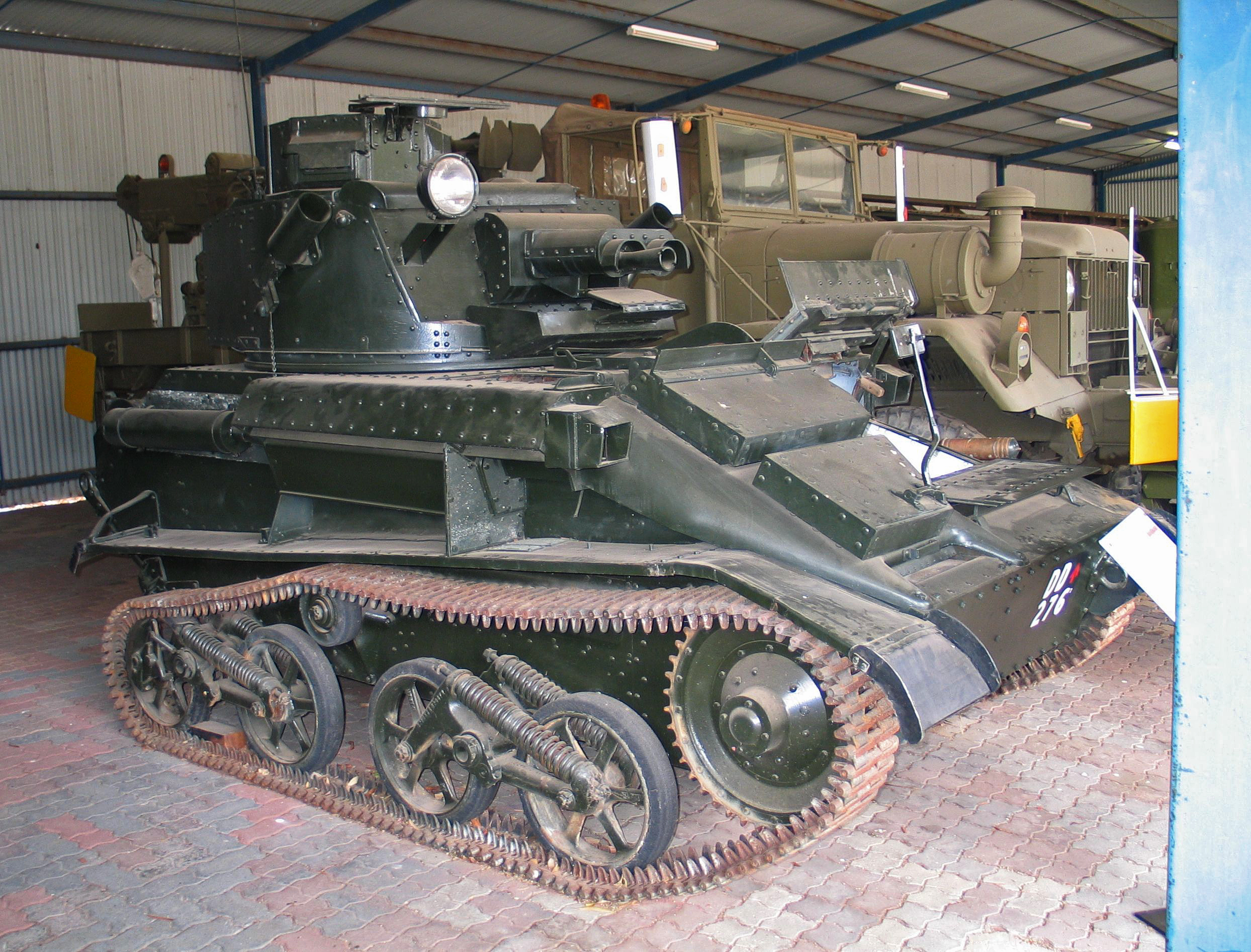
Vickers Mk VIA light tank

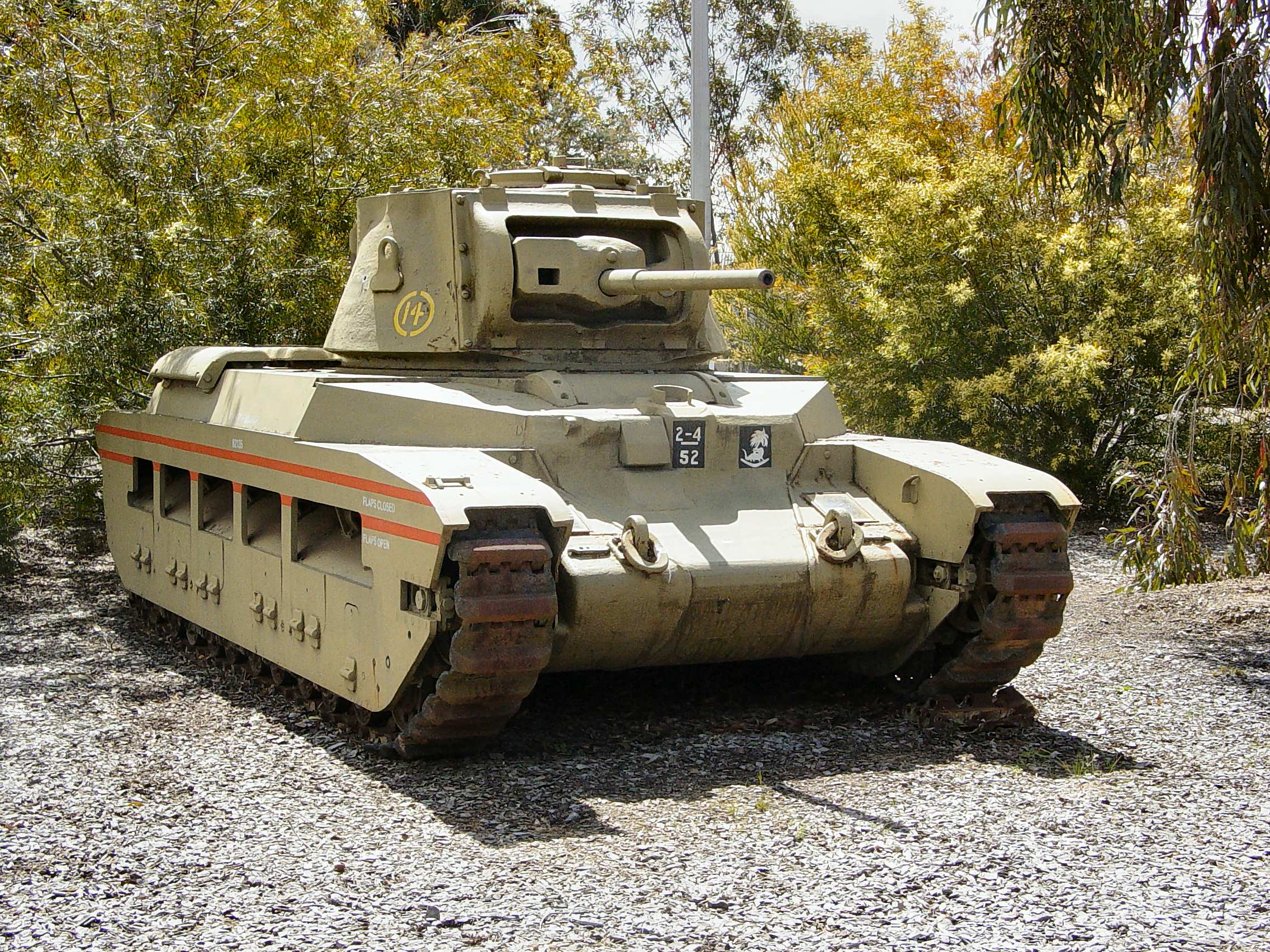
Matilda II tank

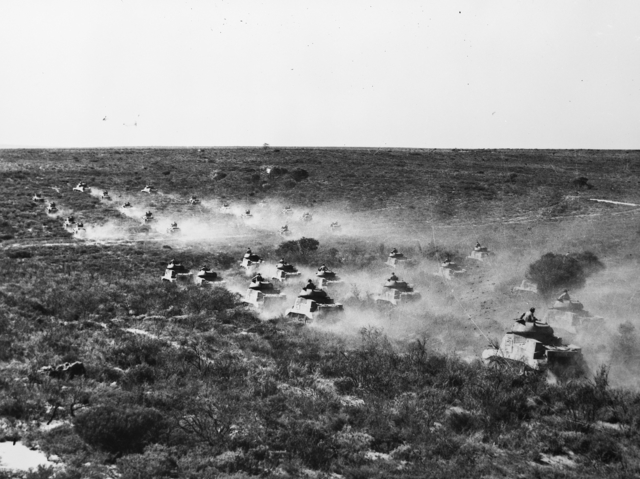
2/10th Armoured Regiment during a training exercise in Western Australia in 1943.

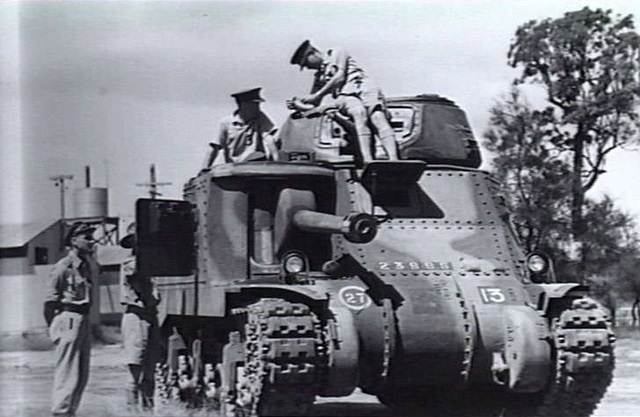
3rd Army Tank Brigade M3 Grant in January 1943

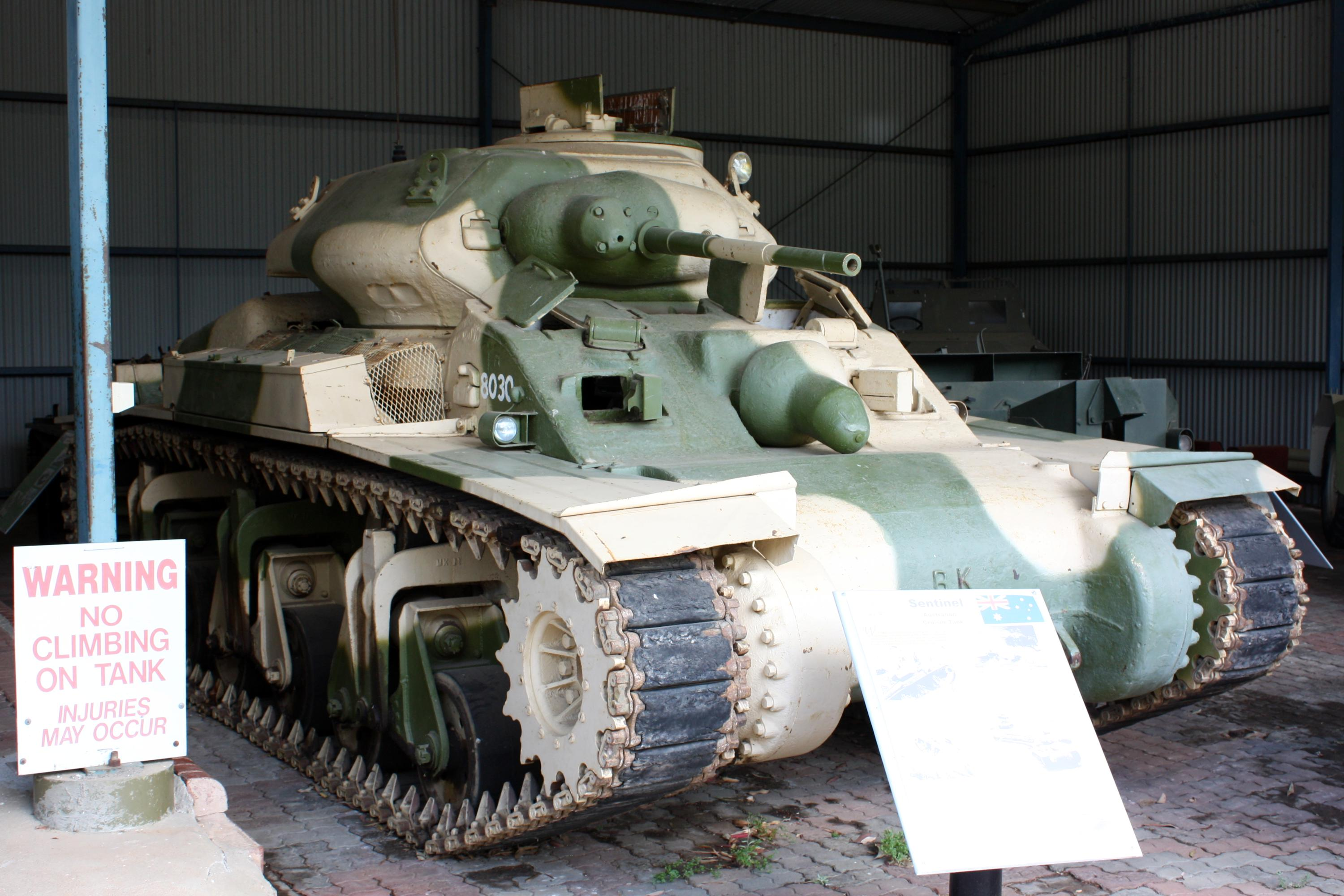
AC1 Sentinel tank

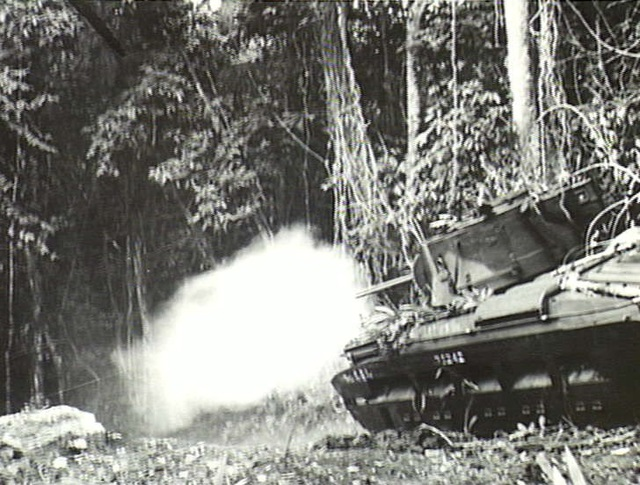
Matilda tank of A Squadron, 1st Tank Battalion, fires at a Japanese foxhole

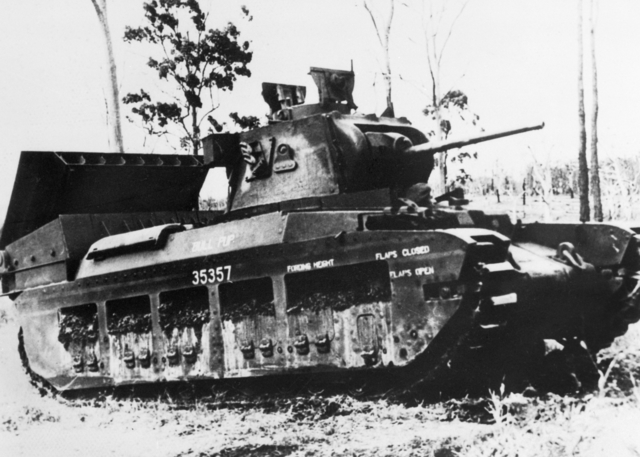
Matilda Hedgehog, with the mortar elevated

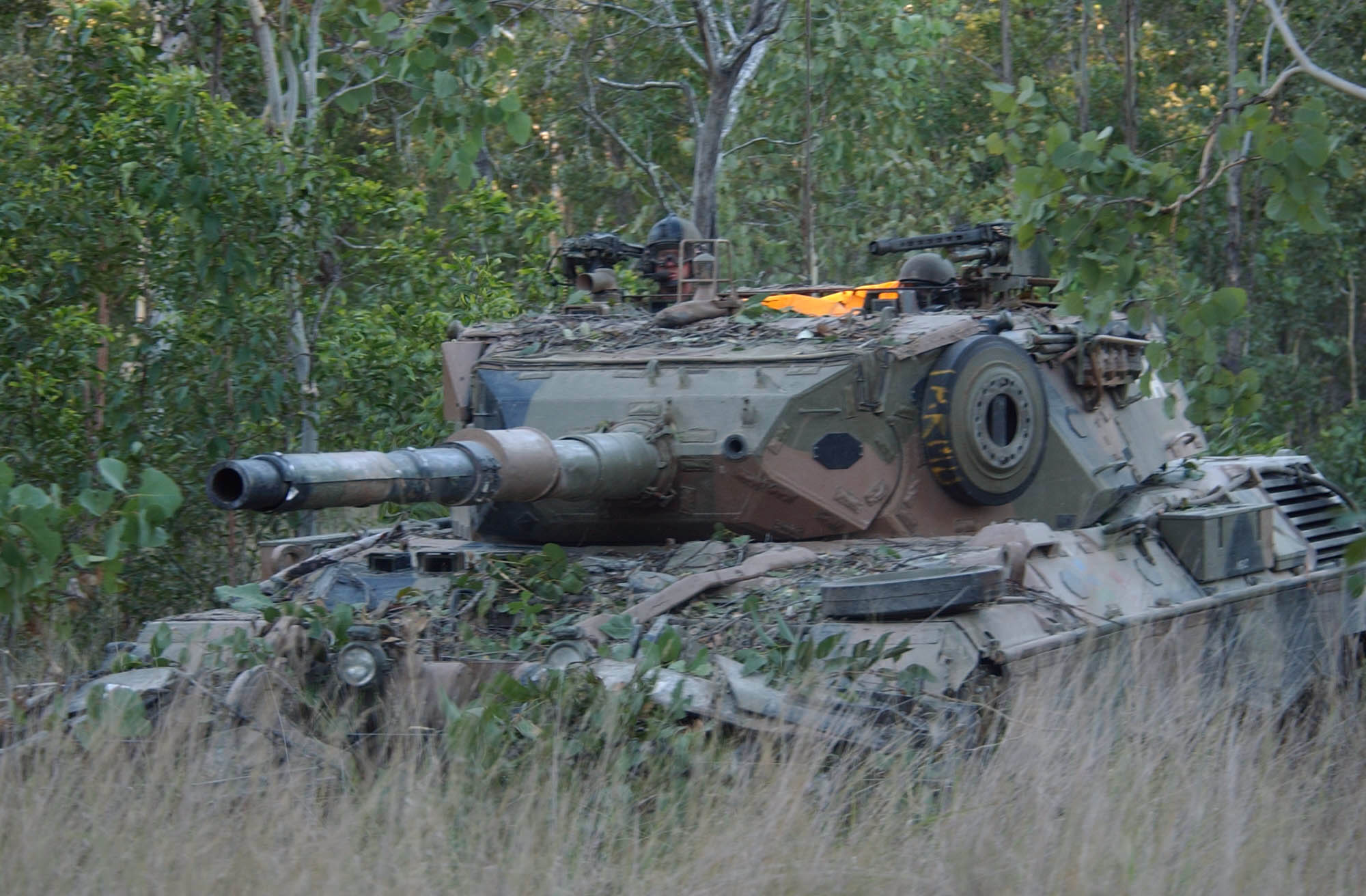
Australian Leopard AS1 in 2005

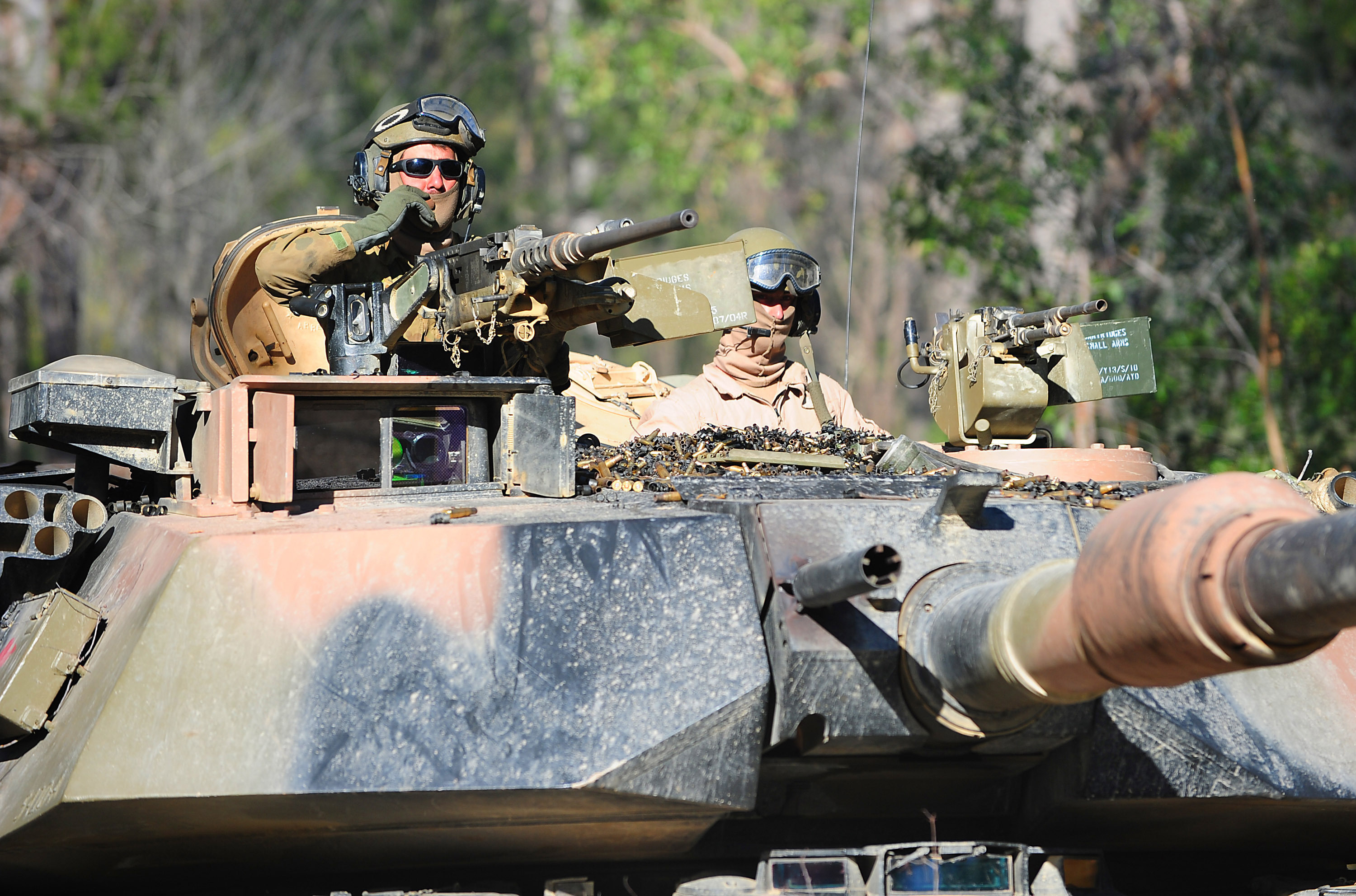
M1A1 in the Australian Army's Disruptive Pattern Camouflage, used for vehicles and materiel. Smoke grenade launchers are seen at left.

== See also ==
- History of the tank
- Australian armoured units of World War II
- Sentinel tank
- Thunderbolt tank
- AC4 tank
- M113 armoured personnel carriers in Australian service

== Notes ==
Footnotes

Citations
