= Australian Tank Corps =

- Active: 1928–41
- Country: Australia
- Branch: Army
- Role: Armoured warfare

Insignia
- Abbreviation: ATC

The Australian Tank Corps was gazetted in December 1927 and officially came into existence the following year. It received a small number of tanks in September 1929 and from this, Australia’s first armoured unit – the 1st Tank Section – was formed, as part of the Militia.

During the early 1930s, amidst the economic austerity of the Great Depression a small cadre of Regular tank corps personnel was maintained for instructional purposes, although by the latter part of the decade the economic situation had improved sufficiently to allow the expansion of the 1st Tank Section into the 1st Light Tank Company, which was augmented by the addition of the 2nd Light Tank Company.

The outbreak of the Second World War in 1939 led to a significant expansion of Australia's armoured force, as each of the four divisions of the Second Australian Imperial Force – except the 8th – raised cavalry reconnaissance regiments equipped with light tanks and scout carriers. The cavalry regiments of the 2nd AIF divisions operating in Mediterranean theatre against Italian and German forces were initially equipped with the Universal Carrier and unarmoured trucks before being progressively mechanised using British Army equipment.

The corps remained in existence throughout the early war years, until the creation of the Australian Armoured Corps (AAC) in July 1941. Between 1941 and 1945, Australia's armoured forces were greatly expanded, with three armoured divisions eventually being formed within the Militia and 2nd AIF, although these were largely used for home defence and only a small number of armoured regiments eventually saw action. These units mainly fought against the Japanese in New Guinea and Borneo in 1943–45. In 1948, the AAC was granted the royal prefix, and became the Royal Australian Armoured Corps.

== See also ==
- Tanks in the Australian Army
