= Arthur Evans (VC) =

English Victoria Cross recipient (1891-1936)

Arthur Walter Evans
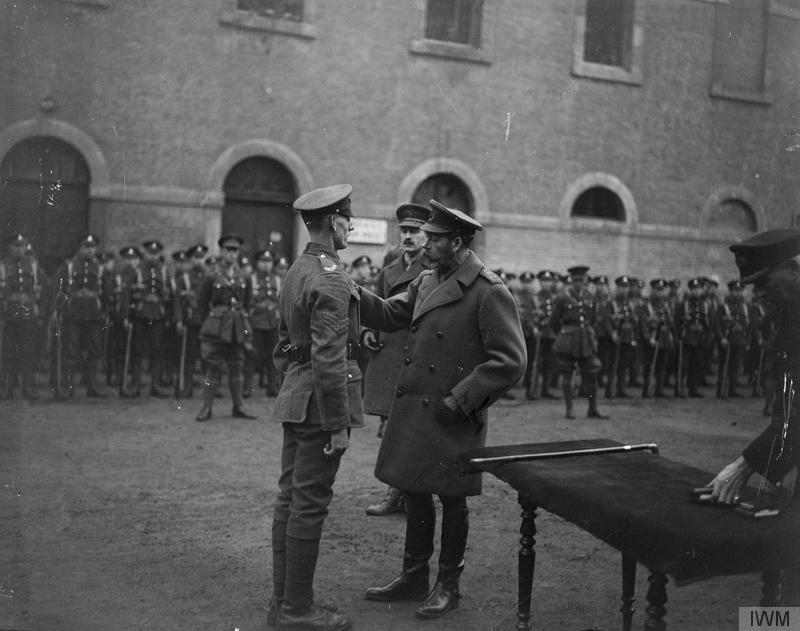
- Arthur Evans being awarded the VC by George V
- Born: 8 April 1891; Liverpool, England
- Died: 1 November 1936 (aged 45); Sydney, Australia
- Military career
- Allegiance: United Kingdom
- Branch: British Army; Australian Army
- Rank: Sergeant
- Units: The Lincolnshire Regiment; Australian Tank Corps
- Conflicts: First World War
- Awards: Victoria Cross; Distinguished Conduct Medal

Arthur Walter Evans VC, DCM (alias "Walter Simpson") (8 April 1891 – 1 November 1936) was an English recipient of the Victoria Cross, the highest award for gallantry in the face of the enemy that can be awarded to British and Commonwealth forces.

== Details ==
Evans was 27 years old, and a lance sergeant in the 6th Battalion, The Lincolnshire Regiment, British Army, during the First World War when the following deed took place for which he was awarded the VC. He was awarded the VC under the alias Walter Simpson with which he had enlisted in the army.

On 2 September 1918 south west of Etaing, France, a patrol reconnoitring on the west bank of a river sighted an enemy machine-gun on the east bank. The river being very deep at that point, Lance Sergeant Evans volunteered to swim across and having done so crawled up behind the machine-gun post, where he shot the sentry and another man and made four more surrender. After a crossing had been found and one officer and one man joined him, machine-gun and rifle fire was opened on them. The officer was wounded and Sergeant Evans covered his withdrawal under very heavy fire.

== The citation ==
The citation reads:

No. 41788 Cpl. (L./Sjt.) Walter Simpson, Linc. R. (Bolton).

For most conspicuous bravery and initiative when with a daylight patrol sent out to reconnoitre and to gain touch with a neighbouring division. When on the west bank of a river an enemy machine-gun post was sighted on the east bank. The river being too deep to ford, Sjt. Simpson volunteered to swim across, and having done so crept up alone in rear of the machine-gun post. He shot the sentry and also a second enemy who ran out; he then turned out and caused four more enemy to surrender. A crossing over the river was subsequently found, and the officer and one man of his patrol joined him, and reconnaissance was continued along the river bank. After proceeding some distance machine-gun and rifle fire was opened on the patrol and the officer was wounded. In spite of the fact that no cover was available, Sjt. Simpson succeeded in covering the withdrawal of the wounded officer under most dangerous and difficult conditions and under heavy fire. The success of the patrol, which cleared up a machine-gun post on the flank of the attacking troops of a neighbouring division and obtained an identification, was greatly due to the very gallant conduct of Sjt. Simpson.

— London Gazette, 30 October 1918.

He was later permitted to re-assume his original name.

== Further information ==
After the war he emigrated to Australia and served in the Australian Tank Corps.

== Bibliography ==
- Murphy, James (2008). Liverpool VCs. Pen and Sword Books. ISBN 978-1844157808.
