= Royal Australian Armoured Corps =

Administrative corps of the Australian Army

Australian Armoured Corps Royal Australian Armoured Corps
- Badge
- Active: 9 July 1941 – present
- Country: Australia
- Branch: Armour
- Type: Corps
- Role: Mounted Combat
- Size: 3 regular regiments 5 reserve regiments and a training unit
- Part of: Australian Army
- Garrison/HQ: Puckapunyal
- Nickname: 'The Black Hats'
- March: Radetzky March, Opus Number 228 by Johann Strauss Senior
- Anniversaries: 9th of July 1941
- Equipment: Armoured Fighting Vehicles

Commanders
- Colonel in Chief: King Charles III
- Representative Honorary Colonel: Major General Michael Krause, AM
- Head of Corps: Brigadier Andrew Moss
- Corps Sergeant Major: Warrant Officer Class 1 Sean McElhinney

Insignia
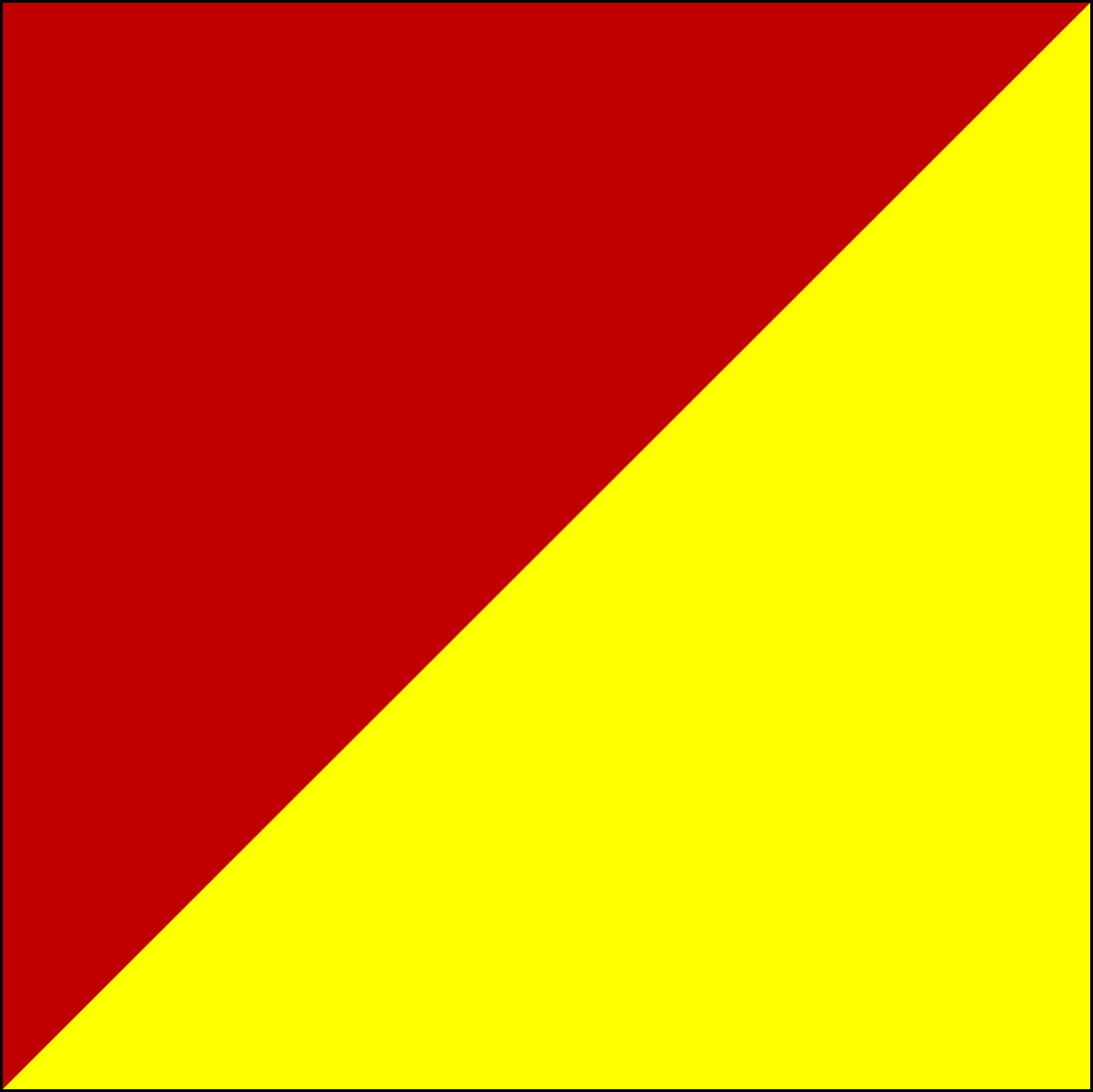
- RAAC Colour patch

The Royal Australian Armoured Corps (RAAC) is an corps of the Australian Army. It provides the Australian Defence Force's Armour capability, which performs the function of mounted combat. Armour combines firepower, mobility, protection and networked situational awareness to generate shock action and overmatch in close combat. Armour is an essential element of the combined arms approach that is employed by the Australian Army.

The RAAC is the senior arms corps within the Army and the custodian of the customs and traditions of Australia's mounted soldiers. The members of the corps are Army's experts in the theory and practice of armoured warfare and operation of armoured fighting vehicles (AFV). While all RAAC members are trained in the technical and tactical employment of armour, they specialise in either the Armoured or Cavalry career streams. Both male and female soldiers and officers serve within the RAAC as armoured vehicle crew. The corps includes both full-time Regular and part-time Reserve units and members. The RAAC provides policy guidance, trade management representation and administrative support for its members.

== Origins ==
The RAAC's origins can be traced back to the Australian Tank Corps (ATC), formed in 1928. Around this time the distinctive headdress of Commonwealth armoured corps members, the black beret, was adopted by the ATC which was affiliated with the Royal Tank Corps.

For most of the 1930s the ATC remained an embryonic organisation containing only a small cadre of permanent staff and the militia 1st Tank Section. At the outbreak of the Second World War the ATC had grown to two militia light tank companies. These, in conjunction with the militia 1st and 2nd Cavalry Divisions, which included the Australian Light Horse (ALH) regiments of First World War fame, comprised Australia's mobile mounted combat forces. In the early stages of the war, the ATC and ALH provided many personnel who formed the basis of the mechanised divisional cavalry and armoured regiments. In order to administer the growing number of units, including the 1st Australian Armoured Division, the Australian Armoured Corps (AAC) was formed on 9 July 1941.

The AAC absorbed the ATC and certain other personnel whose primary function was to operate, instruct or manage AFVs. As a result of the increasing mechanisation of the army, and commensurate waning of horse mounted troops, the ALH was also absorbed into the AAC on 8 May 1942. By this time many ALH units had converted to motorised units, such as reconnaissance and motor regiments, others had mechanised as armoured and tank regiments. At its height the AAC included the 1st, 2nd and 3rd Australian Armoured Divisions, the 3rd Australian Army Tank Brigade and various training centres and regiments, located at Puckapunyal and Singleton ranges. While many individual units served overseas with distinction, by the end of the war these large formations were broken up and much of the wartime AAC was demobilised with the rest of the force. The Australian Armoured Corps was granted the Royal prefix in recognition of its service during the Second World War on 14 December 1948.

== Role ==
The role of the Royal Australian Armoured Corps is to locate, identify, destroy or capture the enemy, by day or night, in combination with other arms, using fire and manoeuvre.

== Unit types ==
To perform this role RAAC units are structured into two types:

Armoured Cavalry. Each contains an Armoured, two Cavalry and a Support Squadron which provide mounted close combat, formation level reconnaissance, surveillance and security and integrated combat service support capabilities.

Light Cavalry. Each contains Light Cavalry and Protected Mobility Squadrons which provide mounted and dismounted reconnaissance, surveillance and security and protected mobility capabilities.

In 2023, the corps has three Regular Armoured Cavalry and five Reserve Light Cavalry regiments and a Regular training unit.

== Training ==
The School of Armour provides mounted combat and combat communications training to officers and soldiers in the Australian Army and selected individuals from abroad. It executes both tactical and technical training for AFV and armoured support vehicle crews. Training at the School of Armour is conducted in the following sub-units:

- Training Squadron
  - Corps Training Wing
  - Communications and Surveillance Wing
  - Driving and Servicing Wing
  - Gunnery Wing
- Tactics Wing
- B Sqn 3rd/4th Cavalry Regiment provides vehicles, equipment and crews to enable Training Sqn and Tactics wing to conduct training.

== Major vehicle types ==
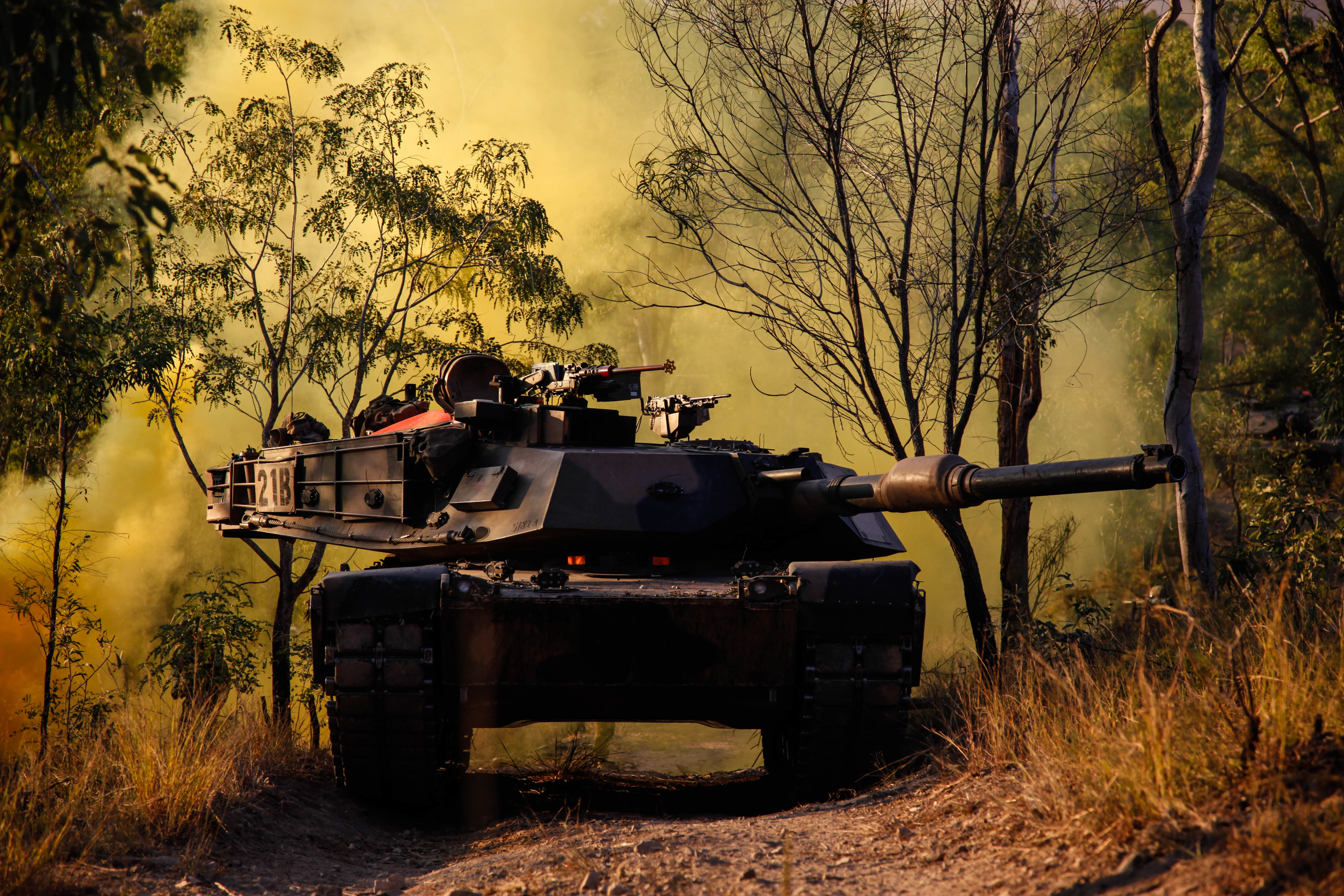
An Australian M1A1 tank during a training exercise

RAAC units are primarily equipped with the following vehicles:

- M1A1 Abrams Integrated Management Situational Awareness (AIM SA) Main Battle Tank (MBT). The Abrams equips Armoured Squadrons and is used to conduct mounted close combat.
- Australian Service Light Armoured Vehicle(ASLAV). The ASLAV Combat Reconnaissance Vehicle (CRV) equips Cavalry Squadrons and is employed to conduct medium surveillance and reconnaissance tasks.
- M113AS4 Armoured Personnel Carrier(APC). The M113AS4 is an upgraded M113A1 APC which is employed in support roles in Armoured Squadrons.
- M88A2 Hercules Armoured Recovery Vehicle (ARV). The Hercules conducts recovery and maintenance tasks in Armoured Squadrons.
- Bushmaster Protected Mobility Vehicle-Medium(PMV-M). The Bushmaster PMV-M provides protected lift within Reserve regiments.
- Hawkei Protected Mobility Vehicle-Light (PMV-L). The Hawkei PMV-L is progressively equipping Light Cavalry squadrons to perform command and control, liaison and surveillance and reconnaissance roles.
- Mercedes Benz G-Wagon. The G-Wagon is a general service utility vehicle employed in all regiments.

== Modernisation ==
The Australian Army is undertaking major modernisation efforts over the next decade to upgrade or replace all of its AFVs and supporting infrastructure, facilities and equipment. The next generation of AFVs will be delivered via a number of projects, these are:

- Land 400 Phase Two: This is replacing the ASLAV with a modern Combat Reconnaissance Vehicle and associated family of vehicles. The Rheinmetall Boxer CRV, derived from the Boxer Multirole Armoured Fighting Vehicle was selected as the replacement for the ASLAV.
- Land 400 Phase Three: This project will replace the 1960s vintage M113AS4 Armoured Personnel Carrier and associated family of vehicles with a modern Infantry Fighting Vehicle capability. In July 2023 the Redback Infantry Fighting Vehicle offered by Hanwha Defense Australia was down selected as Australia's infantry fighting vehicle.
- Land 907 Phase Two: This project will upgrade the General Dynamics Land Systems M1A1 AIM SA Main Battle Tank system to an M1A2 Systems Enhancement Package Version 3 (SEPv3) standard and upgrade the M88A2 armoured recovery vehicle system to a more capable variant.
- Land 8160 Phase One: This project will deliver an armoured engineering system capability based on the M1A1 Abrams main battle tank. This includes armoured breaching, bridging and engineering capabilities.
- In an approach combining both Land 907 and Land 8160 acquisitions, in early 2022 Australia announced it planned to acquire one hundred sixty (160) M1 tank structures/hulls from US stock in order to produce the following vehicles and spares: seventy-five (75) M1A2 SEPv3 Abrams Main Battle Tanks; twenty-nine (29) M1150 assault breacher vehicles; eighteen (18) M1074 Joint Assault Bridges; six (6) M88A2 Hercules Combat Recovery Vehicles; and one hundred twenty-two (122) AGT1500 gas turbine engines.

These combined AFV acquisitions will result in a very significant capability increase for the Australian Army which, under the Defence Strategic Review, will create a combined-arms, amphibiously deployable Armoured Brigade. This capability is being delivered in conjunction with other major projects such as Land 8710 which will deliver a range of littoral manoeuvre vessels, Land 8113 delivering self-propelled howitzers, Land 8116 which will deliver a light multiple rocket launcher capability and Land 4503 delivering the AH-64E Apache helicopter gunship. It will be complemented by Land 200 command, control and communications systems and existing Land 121 logistics capabilities.

== Organisational history ==
The first Regular Army Armour unit created after the Second World War was the 1st Armoured Car Squadron, created in 1946 to serve as part of the British Commonwealth Occupation Force. It was retitled the 1st Armoured Regiment in 1949, in conjunction with a broader reorganisation of the existing Citizens Military Force (CMF). While additional 'numbered' Regular RAAC units were created in the following decades, e.g., the 1st Armoured Personnel Carrier Squadron, CMF unit titles continued to reflect the numbers of amalgamated former Light Horse regiments and their territorial affiliations which signify their links to their recruiting catchment areas, e.g., the 6th New South Wales Mounted Rifles, 7th/21st Australian Horse and 8th/13th Victorian Mounted Rifles. During the early 1950s Army maintained two CMF armoured brigades, the 1st Armoured Brigade in New South Wales and the 2nd Armoured Brigade in Victoria. In addition, divisional reconnaissance and other specialised mechanised units, such as an amphibious armoured assault unit, self-propelled artillery, and motorised infantry were also part of the force. However, as a result of the adoption of the Forward Defence Policy and subsequent restructure of the Army, the brigade headquarters and various units were either disbanded or amalgamated by the end of that decade.

Since the 1960s Army has maintained three principal types of Armour unit: Armoured regiments equipped with tanks, Cavalry units equipped with reconnaissance vehicles and Armoured Personnel Carrier units equipped with APCs. The latter's role was to provide armoured mobility to elements of its parent brigade such as infantry, engineers and artillery observers. While various structures combining these unit types were trialed or even adopted for short periods, such as the RAAC Regiment, Regular Armour units generally conformed to these singular roles. From the early 1970s the 1st Armoured Regiment served as the Australian Army's sole tank unit, building and maintaining Australia's conventional warfighting capability in conjunction with mechanised infantry, combat engineer and medium artillery units. The 2nd Cavalry Regiment primarily served as a formation reconnaissance unit with B Squadron, 3rd Cavalry Regiment and the 4th Cavalry Regiment performing the Armoured Personnel Carrier role. Army Reserve units generally adopted a composite structure of Cavalry and Armoured Personnel Carrier squadrons.

The 1980s witnessed the amalgamation of the 3rd Cavalry Regiment and the 4th Cavalry Regiments into the 3rd/4th Cavalry Regiment in 1981, followed by the reduction of the regiment to a single squadron based in Townsville in 1986. Brisbane-based personnel of the regiment were transferred to the 2nd/14th Light Horse Regiment (Queensland Mounted Infantry) which integrated both Regular and Reserve personnel. While there were fluctuations in the size and part-time/full-time nature of the units throughout the 1990s, this period was generally stable for the RAAC. Changes to the Army force structure in the 2000s resulted in the 2nd/14th Light Horse Regiment becoming a Regular unit in 2005, the removal of the Armoured Personnel Carrier role from the Regular units, and the adoption of the Protected Mobility role within Reserve units. This resulted in the corps adopting Armoured, Cavalry and Light Cavalry unit structures.

The implementation of Plan Beersheba from 2012 led to significant changes in Army's force structure which impacted the corps. First, this led to the transfer of 2nd Cavalry Regiment from 1st Combat Brigade based in Darwin to the 3rd Combat Brigade in Townsville. This meant that each brigade had an Armour unit within it, which offered the promise of improving the combined-arms training of these brigades. Second, the Armoured Cavalry Regiment (ACR) structure was adopted by the three regular regiments. This resulted in each regiment restructuring to an Armoured Squadron, a Cavalry Squadron and an Armoured Mobility Squadron, however these units lost their organic supporting Headquarters and Support Squadron capabilities. This was short lived, as this approach was reversed in 2017 with the armoured mobility role divested to newly (re)raised mechanised infantry battalions and mechanised combat engineer squadrons. As these elements contained their own organic mobility in the form of APCs, the Armoured Mobility Squadrons were converted to Cavalry and reequipped with ASLAV. The Regular ACRs have maintained this structure since. The third aspect of note was the relocation of 1st Armoured Regiment in 2018 south to Adelaide to collocate with the 7th Battalion, Royal Australian Regiment. Both units initially remained part of the 1st Combat Brigade but were later transferred to the Reserve 9th Combat Brigade in 2022 under the Army Objective Force plan. This approach integrated 1st Armoured Regiment, the 7th Battalion, Royal Australian Regiment, 144th Signal Squadron and elements of the 1st Combat Service Support Battalion into the 9th Combat Brigade in late 2022; and was earmarked to introduce into service the self-propelled artillery capability to be acquired under Land 8113.

== Impact of the 2023 Defence Strategic Review upon the RAAC ==
Notably, the April 2023 response to the Defence Strategic Review directed Army to provide an Armoured Brigade capability. To perform the roles and functions of such a formation, this brigade would need to include command, control and communications elements, armoured, cavalry, armoured infantry, mechanised combat engineers and self-propelled artillery units as well as significant logistics support. However, the DSR also drastically reduced the number of infantry fighting vehicles to be acquired under Project Land 400 Phase 3 from 450 to 129. Significant numbers of IFV and IFV based variants are needed to not only re-equip the infantry but also the engineer, artillery and supporting elements within any proposed Armoured Brigade. However, these elements continue to operate the M113AS4 APC which was considered obsolete by the Australian National Audit Office in 2012 even after Defence had upgraded 431 of the legacy vehicles.

The upgraded M113 does represent an improvement on the older, unextended vehicle. However, a vehicle that was considered fit‐for purpose when the minor upgrade was first proposed 20 years ago now lags behind armoured infantry vehicles in use with other armed forces, and is vulnerable in many current threat environments, leaving Defence with an acknowledged capability gap.

Analysis published prior to the DSR response is illustrative of what the reduction in Land 400 Phase 3 might mean for the Army:

If adequate numbers of IFVs are not procured to equip all three combat brigades the force generation cycle will be broken and Army's contribution to national military power altered. While Army may be able to provide a single highly capable rotation from a centralised 'specialised' brigade, other brigade rotations will not benefit from these capabilities, exposing them to greater risk and reducing the likelihood of mission success. Alternatively, land capability may only be able to generate and sustain much smaller IFV-equipped contributions, providing fewer and less capable response options...Simply put, less will result in less.

Commentary from Andrew Greene of the ABC in early September 2023 indicated that the Army was about to undergo another restructure stemming from the Defence Strategic Review, which would directly impact the RAAC. Greene wrote that the Adelaide-based 1st Armoured Regiment and 7th Battalion, Royal Australian Regiment, are 'likely to be absorbed' by the Townsville-based 3rd Combat Brigade. He quoted Army insiders who believe that 1st Armoured Regiment personnel will be transferred to supplement the 2nd Cavalry Regiment. Greene suggested a key factor for the restructure is that the current structure, without adequate IFVs, was no longer viable. Neil James of the Australian Defence Association commented that "The DSR in terms of the army and in the short term, was mainly concerned with saving money and that's probably driving this change rather than any long-term thought". Others have suggested that the 'Army is change fatigued' which may be contributing to retention and recruiting issues and the desire to remove underpopulated 'hollow' units from the force. Likewise, the issues of an army model based on brigades of singular capabilities are not new and have been addressed in previous restructures. Significant issues were identified during the deployment to East Timor in 1999, which manifested during subsequent missions to Iraq, Afghanistan and the Solomon Islands over the 2000s, where there were simply not enough units, units were under-equipped for close combat, there was a lack of combined-arms training and there was widespread shallowness of capability across Army. These issues ultimately resulted in a range of initiatives such as the Hardened and Networked Army, Enhanced Land Force, Strategic Force Generation Cycle and Plan Beersheba to address the challenges of simultaneously deploying forces to fight in multiple theatres and perform a broad range of missions.

This plan was confirmed on 28 September at a press conference by the deputy prime minister, Richard Marles, at Townsville with further detail in other reporting. These stated that 1st Armoured Regiment would lose its armoured vehicles and be reduced to an 'innovation and experimentation unit' while remaining in Adelaide. However, its sister infantry unit, 7th Battalion, Royal Australian Regiment is to be disbanded, with the unit number re-linked with the 5th Battalion in Darwin to reform 5th/7th Battalion. This decision consolidates all the Army's heavy armour, including all its tanks, infantry fighting vehicles, armoured personnel carriers, self-propelled howitzers and armoured engineering systems in a single brigade in Townsville. Concurrent to this, the Army's attack aviation and heavy-lift aviation is also being consolidated into Townsville and the 9th Combat Brigade is to be re-roled as a Security and Response brigade, reducing the Army's four Combat brigades to a Light Littoral Brigade, an Armoured Brigade and a Motorised Brigade. Ground-based air defence and long-range strike capabilities will now form part of another formation, the 10th Brigade, in Adelaide. The removal of 1st Armoured Regiment as a combat unit, the RAAC's oldest regular unit and one of its most decorated, effectively reduces the number of active combat Armour units in the Army to two; the 2nd Cavalry Regiment in Townsville and 2nd/14th Light Horse Regiment in Brisbane, with the latter equipped with the Boxer CRV only. This is the fewest number of regular Armour units in the Australian Army's order of battle since 1966, when 1st Cavalry Regiment was raised to serve alongside 1st Armoured Regiment.

== Operational service ==
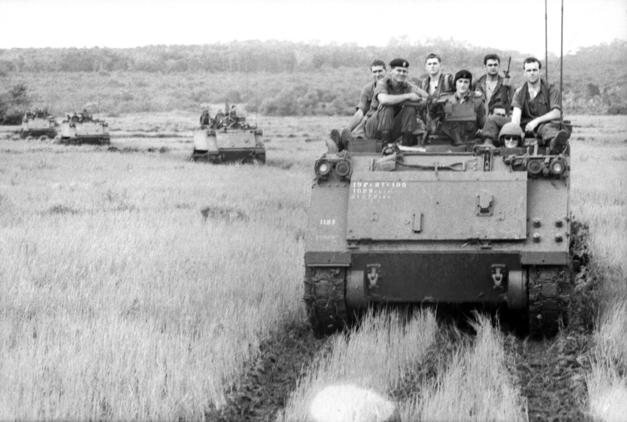
M113s from the 1st Armoured Personnel Carrier Squadron carrying soldiers of the 6th Battalion, Royal Australian Regiment during the Vietnam War

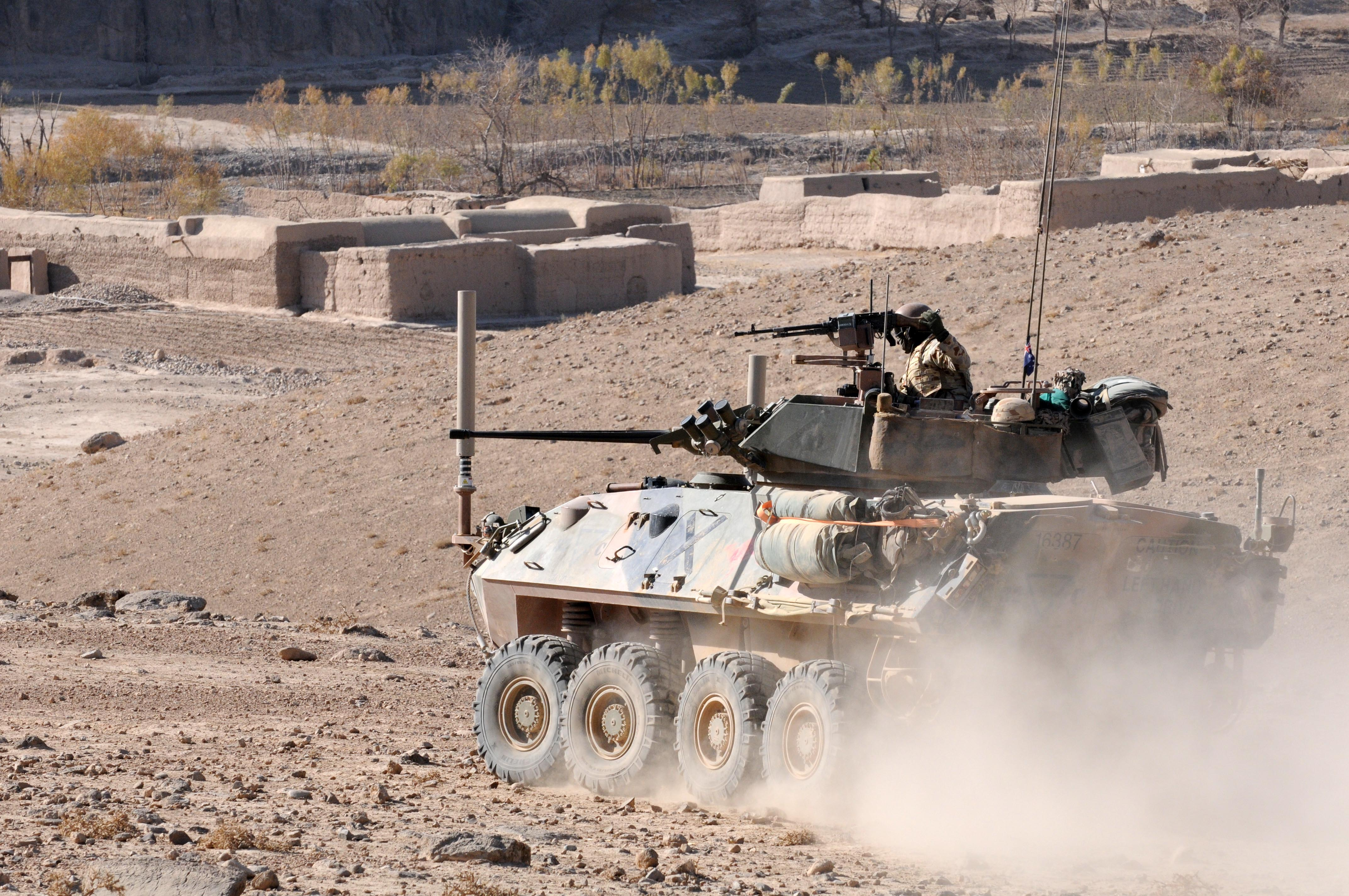
An ASLAV in Afghanistan during 2010

The corps has served in wars, conflicts and peace support missions across a wide range of theatres. These include the Second World War, the post-war occupation of Japan, South Vietnam, Somalia, Rwanda, East Timor, Iraq and Afghanistan.

- Libya: 1940–41
- Palestine: 1941
- Cyprus: 1941
- Syria: 1941–42
- Egypt: 1942–43
- Australia: 1941–1945
- New Guinea: 1941–45
- Bougainville: 1944–45
- Borneo: 1944–45
- Japan: 1946–49
- Vietnam: 1965–71
- East Timor: 1999–2010
- Iraq: 2003–2008
- Afghanistan: 2006–2012

Members of the corps have participated in a wide range of individual and small group deployments from Korea to the Sudan and the Solomon Islands as well as domestic support operations in Australia and its territorial waters.

== Regiments and Units of the Corps ==
=== Regular ===
- Head of Corps, Staff.
- 1st Armoured Regiment. Experimentation.
- 2nd Cavalry Regiment. Armoured Cavalry.
- 2nd/14th Light Horse Regiment (Queensland Mounted Infantry). Armoured Cavalry.
- School of Armour – Training Unit.
  - B Squadron, 3rd/4th Cavalry Regiment. Tasked to support the School of Armour with vehicles, equipment and crews.
- Staff within the Land Combat Vehicle Program, Army Headquarters, and Armoured Vehicles Division, Capability Acquisition and Sustainment Group.
- RAAC members also individually serve in various units and organisations across the Department of Defence and Australian Defence Force.

=== Reserve ===
- 1st/15th Royal New South Wales Lancers. Light Cavalry.
- 3rd/9th Light Horse (South Australia Mounted Rifles), A Squadron. Light Cavalry.
- 4th/19th Prince of Wales's Light Horse. Light Cavalry.
- 10th Light Horse Regiment. Light Cavalry.
- 12th/16th Hunter River Lancers. Light Cavalry.

=== Inactive/former units ===
- Headquarters 1st and 2nd Armoured Brigades (CMF). Reduced to skeleton staff in 1956 and disbanded in 1960.
- 1st Armoured Personnel Carrier Squadron. Retitled A Squadron, 3rd Cavalry Regiment in January 1967.
- 1st Cavalry Regiment. Retitled 2nd Cavalry Regiment in January 1967.
- 3rd Cavalry Regiment. Amalgamated with 4th Cavalry Regiment in 1981 to form 3rd/4th Cavalry Regiment.
- 4th Cavalry Regiment. Amalgamated with 3rd Cavalry Regiment in 1981 to form 3rd/4th Cavalry Regiment.
- 6th New South Wales Mounted Rifles. Transferred as 6th New South Wales Mounted Rifles to the Royal Australian Infantry Corps in 1956. It became E Company of 2nd Battalion the Royal New South Wales Regiment under the Pentropic reorganisation of 1960.
- 7th/21st Australian Horse. Disbanded and personnel used to form 4th Battalion (Australian Rifles) in 1957. This unit became D Company of 3rd Battalion the Royal New South Wales Regiment under the Pentropic reorganisation of 1960
- 8th/13th Victorian Mounted Rifles. Reduced to an independent squadron in 1976, disbanded in 1991 and now forms part of 4th/19th Prince of Wales' Light Horse.
- 15th Northern Rivers Lancers. Disbanded 1957, linked with 1st Royal New South Wales Lancers to form 1st/15th Royal New South Wales Lancers.

== RAAC Ironsides Journal ==
The RAAC publishes an annual journal Ironsides. This provides current and former members of the corps with an update of the direction of the future of the corps from its key leadership, reports from each of the units on their activities, modernisation updates and historical articles of interest.

== See also ==
- Royal Armoured Corps
- US Armor Branch
- Royal New Zealand Armoured Corps
- Royal Canadian Armoured Corps
- South African Armoured Corps
- Australian Army Museum Puckapunyal
- Australian armoured units of World War II
- List of Australian armoured units
- Tanks in the Australian Army
- M113 armored personnel carriers in Australian service

== Notes ==
Preceded by Corps of Staff Cadets	Australian Army Order of Precedence	Succeeded by Royal Australian Artillery
