= 1st Armoured Personnel Carrier Squadron (Australia) =

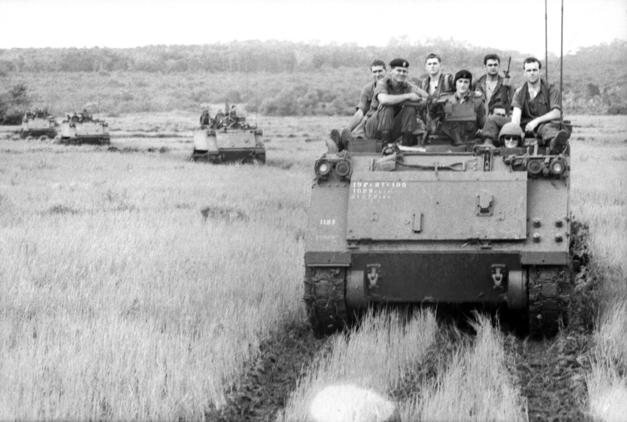
- M113s from the 1st Armoured Personnel Carrier Squadron carrying soldiers of the 6th Battalion, Royal Australian Regiment in 1966
- Active: July 1965 – January 1967
- Country: Australia
- Branch: Army
- Type: Cavalry
- Role: Armoured personnel carrier
- Size: 7 officers, 109 other ranks
- Part of: Royal Australian Armoured Corps
- Engagements: Vietnam War: Battle of Long Tan

Commanders
- Notable commanders: Major Robert Hagerty

The 1st Armoured Personnel Carrier Squadron (1 APC Sqn) was an armoured unit of the Australian Army raised for service during the Vietnam War. Raised in 1965, the unit was deployed to South Vietnam in May 1966 to join the 1st Australian Task Force. After that 1 APC Sqn was involved in numerous operations in support of the 5th and 6th Battalions, the Royal Australian Regiment, with the most notable action coming on 18 August 1966 when the squadron was involved in the Battle of Long Tan. In January 1967, 1 APC Sqn was redesignated as 'A' Squadron, 3rd Cavalry Regiment.

== History ==
=== Formation ===
1 APC Sqn has a convoluted history. Officially the unit was first raised at Puckapunyal, Victoria, on 1 July 1965; however, the squadron also draws lineage from 1 Troop, 'A' Squadron, 4th/19th Prince of Wales's Light Horse (1 Tp A Sqn 4/19 PWLH). 1 Tp A Sqn 4/19 PWLH was a Regular sub unit of a primarily Citizens Military Force light cavalry regiment. In June 1965, this unit was converted from Saladin armoured cars and Saracen armoured personnel carriers (APCs) to M113s and sent to South Vietnam as part of Australia's initial commitment to the Vietnam War. Working primarily with 1 RAR, the troop was placed under the control of the US 173rd Airborne Brigade, operating in an area to the north of Nui Dat in Phuoc Tuy Province.

Under the command of Lieutenant (later Captain) Robert Hill, initially the troop was deployed with only eight carriers as at the start of the Australian commitment to the ground war in Vietnam, the Australian government intended to limit the size of Australia's forces to a single infantry battalion tasked with maintaining security around the American base at Bien Hoa. In September, however, as it became clearer that there was a wider role for Australian ground forces the size of the troop was increased to 13 personnel carriers and two mortar carriers and after that the troop was used in a variety of roles including infantry mobility, manoeuvre, direct and indirect fire support, casualty evacuation and providing a medium lift stores transportation capability.

In March 1966, 1 Tp A Sqn 4/19 PWLH was redesignated as the "1st Armoured Personnel Carrier Troop" (1 APC Troop) and it subsequently completed its tour of Vietnam in June 1966. At that time, 1 APC Sqn arrived and all of 1 Troop's vehicles and some of its personnel were subsumed into the squadron. (Note: The AWM states that 1 APC Troop became 1 APC Sqn's No. 3 Troop, however, Anderson states that the squadron was originally composed of 2 and 3 Troop upon deployment and then subsumed 1 Troop upon arrival, with 1 Troop keeping that designation.)

While 1 APC Troop had been conducting operations in Vietnam, 1 APC Sqn had been training in Australia in preparation to relieve the overworked troop. On 9 March 1966, the Australian government announced that it would increase the size of Australia's ground forces in Vietnam to a task force consisting of two infantry battalions, a squadron of armoured personnel carriers and a number of ancillary units. Additionally, it was also announced that the Australian Task Force, known as 1 ATF, would operate as an independent force from the Americans and would take primary responsibility for an area inside Phuoc Tuy province.

=== Deployment to Vietnam ===
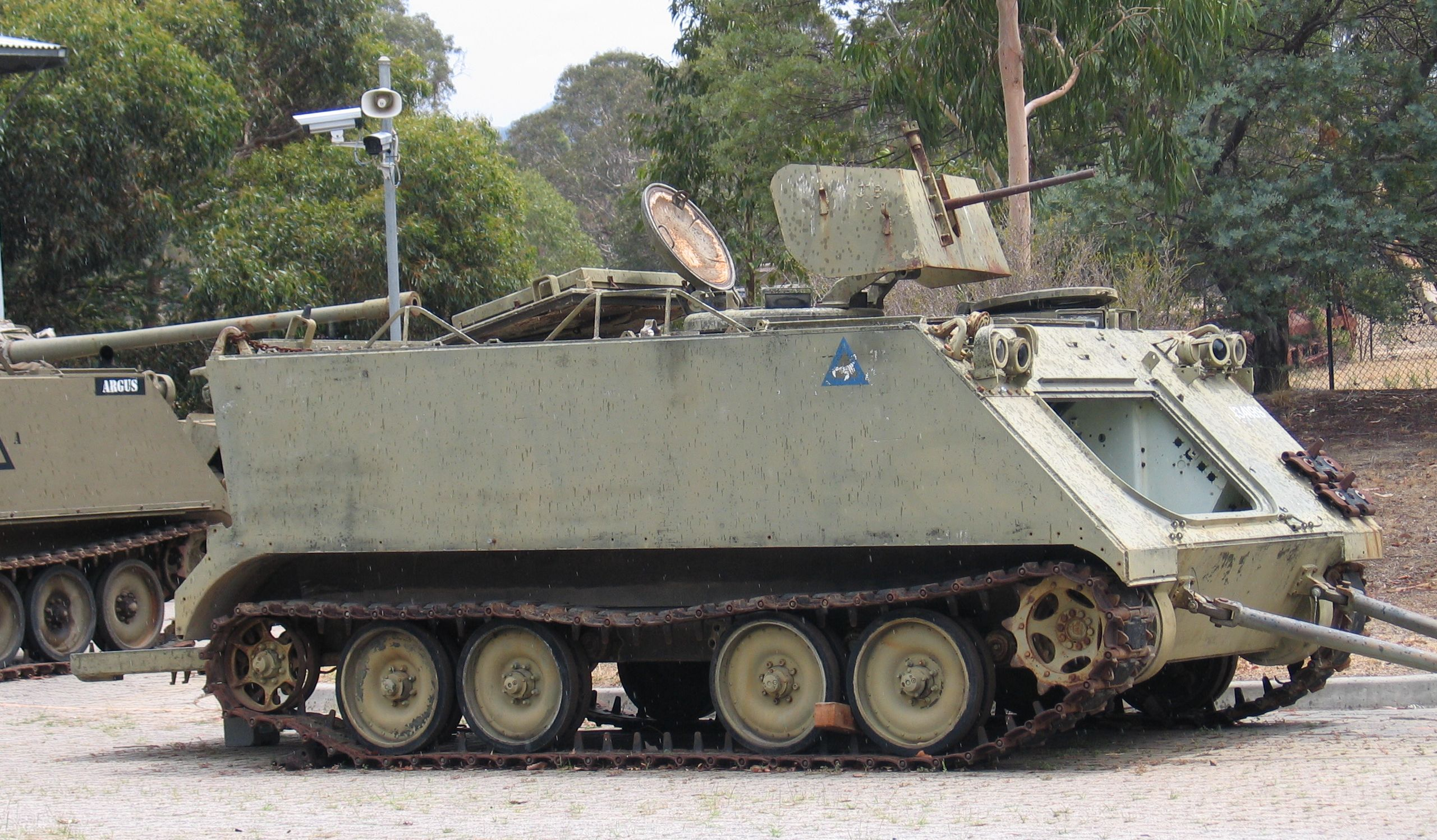
An M113 APC similar to the type used by 1 APC Sqn in Vietnam

In May 1966, an advanced party from the squadron arrived to take over 1 APC Troop's vehicles, while the rest of the squadron, travelling upon the troop carrier HMAS Sydney, arrived at the 1 ATF base at Nui Dat on 9 June 1966. Under the command of Major Robert Hagerty, who had previously served in Vietnam with the AATTV, the squadron consisted of seven officers and 109 other ranks. Some of these men were national servicemen, although most of the officers and NCOs were regulars drawn from the 1st Armoured Regiment and from 'A' Squadron, 4/19 PWLH.

Upon its arrival, 1 APC Sqn's first task was to help secure the task force base at Nui Dat by erecting defences and clearing the area; however, once this had been done, the squadron took on primary responsibility for ensuring that the road between Vung Tau and Saigon remained open. In order to achieve this, a number of cordon and search operations were undertaken focusing on the villages surrounding Nui Dat. On 21 June 1966, 3 Troop was deployed with 6 RAR on Operation Enoggera, a search and destroy mission that focused upon the village of Long Phuoc, which had long been a haven for the Viet Cong (VC).

As 1 ATF did not possess any tanks at that stage, the APCs of 1 APC Sqn were in high demand and were required to undertake many different roles in this time. These included both cavalry and armoured personnel roles, such as fire support, reconnaissance and offensive manoeuvre, as well as serving as infantry command and control vehicles, troop transport, stores portage, and casualty evacuation. Whilst 1 APC Sqn was involved in many operations in the six months that it was in existence, probably its most notable action was on 18 August 1966 in what later became known as the Battle of Long Tan. 1 APC Sqn's involvement at Long Tan came at a very crucial moment in battle, but nevertheless their involvement in this battle has received little acknowledgement.

1 APC Sqn's first task during the battle was to transport 'A' Company, 6 RAR to the battlefield to relieve 'D' Company, which was holding out against desperate odds in a rubber plantation to the west of Long Tan. This task fell to ten APCs from 3 Troop under the command of Lieutenant Adrian Roberts. Having picked up 'A' Company from their lines at Nui Dat, the column received permission and set off across country in the pouring rain at 18:00 hours. Fording a flooded creek, they shook out into assault formation astride the plantation road. The move took just over an hour, as the column had to fight its way through pockets of enemy and brave the heavy defensive artillery barrage that was being put down around 'D' Company; however, by 19:00 hours they reached the beleaguered company.

Upon arriving at the plantation, 3 Troop advanced through 'D' Company's position, carrying out a quick sweep of the area through which the attacking Vietnamese were forming up for another attack, catching the enemy on their flanks and inflicting heavy casualties. Upon seeing the arrival of the APCs the enemy broke off its attack, the survivors melting away back into the jungle and leaving the Australians in possession of the battlefield. The Australians suffered 18 men killed and 24 wounded. Of these, one of the men that had been killed was from 3 Troop. The man was Corporal Peter Clements, who died on 27 August 1966 after succumbing to the serious gunshot wounds he received during the battle.

For their actions during the battle, two men from 3 Troop received gallantry awards. Corporal John Carter received the Distinguished Conduct Medal for his actions in neutralising an enemy anti-tank weapon, while Lieutenant Adrian Roberts received a Mention in Despatches for his leadership of the troop during the battle. Following the battle, 1 APC Sqn continued to operate in the area, supporting 5 and 6 RAR. As a part of the follow-up operations, during Operation Crows Nest, one troop operated in a cavalry role as part of a combined infantry/armour sweep either side of Route 2. They continued to operate in this role, providing fire support and transporting troops across the battlefield for the rest of the year.

=== Redesignation ===
In January 1967, after a re-organisation of units of the Royal Australian Armoured Corps, 1 APC Sqn was re-designated as 'A' Squadron, 3rd Cavalry Regiment. This squadron subsequently rotated with the regiment's second squadron, 'B' Squadron, as the 3rd Cavalry Regiment maintain a squadron on operations in Vietnam up until November 1971. 1 Troop remained even longer, staying on until March 1972.

== Structure ==
- Sqn HQ
  - Admin Troop
  - 1 Troop (previously 1 APC Troop)
  - 2 Troop
  - 3 Troop
  - Support Troop (later redesignated as 4 Troop).

== Commanding officers ==
- Major Robert Edmund Hagerty.

== Decorations ==
- 1 DCM
- 1 MID. (Note: During the deployment of 1 Tp A Sqn 4/19 PWLH, Lieutenant Bob Hill was awarded the Military Cross for his actions at Phuoc Loc in June 1965. He was also later awarded the US Bronze Star. Sergeant Wally Grieg was also awarded the US Army Commendation Medal for Meritorious Service.)

== See also ==
- Military history of Australia during the Vietnam War

== Notes ==
Footnotes

Citations
