= 2nd Light Tank Company (Australia) =

- Active: 1939–1941
- Country: Australia
- Branch: Army
- Type: Armoured

The 2nd Light Tank Company was an Australian Army armoured unit formed in March 1939 equipped with the Vickers Medium Mark II medium tank.

The unit was based at Caulfield, Victoria.
