= 1st Light Tank Company (Australia) =

- Active: 1937 – March 1941
- Country: Australia
- Branch: Army
- Type: Armoured
- Role: Armoured warfare

The 1st Light Tank Company was an Australian Army armoured unit formed in 1937 equipped with the Vickers Light Tank MkIIA light tank.

The unit was raised in November 1937 from the disbanded 1st Tank Section, with the men and equipment transferred to the unit and was based at Randwick, New South Wales. The unit was disbanded in March 1941.
