= 1st Tank Section (Australia) =

- Active: 1930–1937
- Country: Australia
- Branch: Army
- Type: Armoured

The 1st Tank Section was an Australian Army armoured unit formed in 1930 equipped with the Vickers Medium Mark II medium tank.

The unit was raised in February 1930 and was based at Randwick, New South Wales. Training was undertaken at Greenhills part of the Liverpool Military Area, Sydney. The unit was disbanded in November 1937 with the men and equipment transferring to the newly created 1st Light Tank Company.

== Commanding Officer ==
- Captain E T Penfold
