= Australian Regiment (1899–1900) =

- Active: 26 November 1899 – 7 April 1900
- Country: New South Wales; South Australia; Tasmania; Western Australia; Victoria
- Allegiance: British Empire
- Type: Infantry (Mounted Infantry from December 1899)
- Engagements: Second Boer War

Commanders
- Notable commanders: John Hoad

The Australian Regiment was a regiment of troops from the Australian colonies that served in the Second Boer War. It began its existence as infantry but was soon mounted due to the conditions of the war.

== History ==
The Australian Regiment was formed on 26 November 1899 at Cape Town under the command of Victorian Colonel John Hoad with units of the first contingents sent by Australian colonies to fight in the Second Boer War, the first wholly Australian regiment formed for combat duty. It initially included infantry companies from Victoria, South Australia, Western Australia, and Tasmania, as well as the Victorian Mounted Rifles squadron; the only colony not ultimately represented was Queensland. The regiment numbered 716 and was equipped with three Maxim guns. It spent the next few days re-equipping at Maitland camp, where it was inspected by Governor of Cape Colony and High Commissioner for Southern Africa Sir Alfred Milner on 28 November.

It entrained for De Aar to join the relief force for Kimberley under Major General Andrew Wauchope on 1 December. Arriving at De Aar two days later, the regiment was instead forwarded to Orange River, where it joined the relief force. Four scouts from Rimington's Guides were attached to the regiment on 6 December; their leader, Corporal John James Clements, would subsequently receive the Victoria Cross. The Australians marched eleven miles to Witteputs during the day on 7 December and a further ten miles to Belmont during the rainy night. Reinforced by the New South Wales infantry company on 9 December, they marched to Enslin and encamped there with two Royal Horse Artillery guns on the next day.

The 1st Gordon Highlanders, two more field guns, and detachments of Royal Engineers and Rimington's Guides were sent to the camp on 16 December, where they came under the command of Hoad. On New Years' Day 1900 fifty men from the Victorian Mounted Rifles under Captain Duncan McLeish made a reconnaissance toward Douglas and scouted a Boer laager there without engagement. The Victorian Mounted Rifles participated in another reconnaissance into the Orange Free State under Major General James Melville Babington on 9 January. The 12th Lancers came under the command of Hoad at Enslin on 17 January.

It served in the northern part of Cape Colony and was quickly mounted in December due to the demand of the conflict for mounted troops. The regiment fought in the defence of the Colesberg front between 9 and 12 February and the advance into the Orange Free State. The regiment was disbanded after it reached Bloemfontein in April; Hoad was made a Commander of the Order of St Michael and St George for his leadership.
