= 1911 Coronation Honours (Australia) =

1911 appointments in honour of the new monarch

The 1911 Coronation Honours were awarded in honour of the coronation of George V.

== Most Honourable Order of the Bath ==
=== Companion of the Order of the Bath (CB) ===
- Colonel (temporary Major-General) George Macaulay Kirkpatrick, Inspector-General, Military Forces, Commonwealth of Australia.

== Most Distinguished Order of St Michael and St George ==
=== Knight Grand Cross of the Order of St Michael and St George (GCMG) ===
- The Right Honourable The Lord Denman, KCVO, PC, Governor-General and Commander-in-Chief designate of the Commonwealth of Australia
- Sir George Houston Reid, KCMG, High Commissioner in London for the Commonwealth of Australia

=== Knight Commander of the Order of St Michael and St George (KCMG) ===
- Rear-Admiral William Rooke Creswell, CMG, Director of Naval Forces of the Commonwealth of Australia
- Sir John Fuller, 1st Baronet, Governor of the State of Victoria
- Major-General John Charles Hoad, CMG, Chief of the General Staff of the Military Forces of the Commonwealth of Australia

=== Companion of the Order of St Michael and St George (CMG) ===
- Robert Archibald Ranking, Esq., First Police Magistrate of the State of Queensland.
- Lionel Henry Sholl, Esq., ISO, Under Secretary and Government Statist of the State of South Australia.
- The Honourable Frank Wilson, Premier and Colonial Treasurer of the State of Western Australia.

== Imperial Service Order ==
=== Companion of the Imperial Service Order (ISO) ===
- William Davidson, Esq., Inspector General of Public Works of the State of Victoria.
- James William Jones, Esq., Secretary, Office of the Commissioner of Public Works, and chairman, Supply and Tender Board, State of South Australia.
- John Mackay, Esq., Portmaster, Harbour Master and Chairman of the Marine Board, State of Queensland.
- Clayton Turner Mason, Esq., late Collector of Customs (Western Australia), Department of Trade and Customs, Commonwealth of Australia.
