= 3rd/9th Light Horse (South Australian Mounted Rifles) =

Australian Army Reserve unit

3rd/9th Light Horse Regiment (South Australian Mounted Rifles)
- Cap badge of the 3rd/9th Light Horse (South Australian Mounted Rifles)
- Active: 1948–present
- Country: Australia
- Branch: Australian Army
- Type: Light cavalry
- Part of: 9th Brigade
- Garrison/HQ: Adelaide
- Motto: Nec Aspera Terrent
- March: Quick – Fare Thee Well Inniskilling
- Anniversaries: 26 Feb 1840

Commanders
- Current commander: Major Hamish McKendrick
- Colonel-in-Chief: King Charles III (Colonel-in-Chief, RAAC)

Insignia
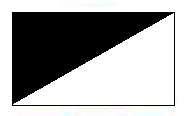
- Unit colour patch
- Abbreviation: 3/9 LH (SAMR)

The 3rd/9th Light Horse (South Australian Mounted Rifles) (3/9 LH (SAMR)) is a Reserve light cavalry regiment of the Australian Army based in South Australia. It is constituted of a single squadron. It is part of the Royal Australian Armoured Corps (RAAC), the regiment is attached to the 9th Brigade, and currently operates Hawkei Protected Mobility Vehicle - Light (PMV-L) and G-wagon surveillance and reconnaissance vehicles (SRV). 3rd/9th Light Horse (South Australian Mounted Rifles) is currently under command of 1st Armoured Regiment.

== Colonial History ==
The Unit traces its history back to the South Australian Volunteer Cavalry that was Gazetted by the South Australian Governor Lieutenant Colonel George Gawler on the 26 Feb 1840. Formed as part of a South Australian Volunteer Militia Brigade with a company of infantry and two troops of cavalry. By April 1840, it had a total strength of 77 and, by June, with a severe economic depression and wave of lawlessness, all training ceased with the brigade disbanded although the officers continued to "dine" together. With a new perceived Russian threat, South Australia's Legislative Council introduced the 1854 bill to raise a volunteer militia of 850 men, with 14 troops of artillery, four troops of Infantry and eight troops of mounted infantry, Acts No 2 and 9 of 1854. The low government pay of one shilling a day meant groups formed their own volunteer forces including independent cavalry corps, most notably in East Torrens, Para and Goolwa. The South Australian Mounted Rifles (SAMR) was formed at this time in 1854. This corps received no pay, found their own arms and equipment and had one captain, one lieutenant, one cornet, one surgeon and 27 troopers.

By 1856, the government's Military Force Act was repealed and its "regiment" disbanded. In 1859 and 1860, amendments to the 1854 Militia Acts were passed, manly involving pay and conditions. The Reedbeds Cavalry formed in the Adelaide western wetlands area, the later suburbs of Cowandilla, Lockleys, Underdale and West beach in 1860. With another European war scare in 1866 and the revival of South Australia's voluntary militia (The Volunteer Act 1865-6) including cavalry, Capt Ferguson of the Reedbeds accepted command of B Troop and the squadron named The Duke of Edinburgh's Light Dragoons by the duke during a South Australia visit. South Australia's volunteer militias began to wain and by 1870 had disbanded due to lack of finance and support until war started between Russia and Turkey in 1877.

Responding to concerned citizens, the Adelaide mayor called a public meeting in May that year to discuss the colony's defences and it opened lists for volunteers. James Rowell, who rose through the South Australian Mounted Rifles ranks, was at the meeting. In 1878, the Military Force Act was passed, but the first parade of the Adelaide Mounted Rifles was in August 1877 and the force was divided into two troops, each of 32 men and one officer. Weekly parades were on Saturday afternoons in the park lands.

In 1886, the South Australian Defence Force Act was passed and by 1887, the South Australian Mounted Rifles/Infantry had more than 1,000 troops in major country centres as well as the two troops of Adelaide Lancers formed from the South Australian Mounted Rifles in 1886.The South Australian Governor, the earl of Kintore, was an honorary colonel of the lancers, whose role was mainly ceremonial and, in 1897, a 28-strong detachment from the militia unit was sent to London to represent the colony at the 1897 celebrations in honour of the Diamond Jubilee of Queen Victoria, under the command of Lieutenant Colonel James Rowell. The Defence Force Act of 1895 was passed in December of that year and grouped the colonial forces into 3 categories: Permanent Force, Active Militia Force (paid) and the Reserve Militia (unpaid).

== Boer War and WW1 History ==
In 1899, the South Australian Mounted Riles (SAMR) started contributing personnel to fight in the Second Boer War as part of the South Australian Mounted Rifles 1st and 2nd Contingent, then the South Australian Bushman's Contingent, Imperial Bushman and the Australian Commonwealth Horse, after federation. These contingents were newly raised as militia units were prevented from overseas service. In 1903, as part on the new Commonwealth forces, SAMR was expanded initially into two Australian Light Horse Regiments, the 16th and 17th Light Horse Regiments, then in 1912 a third being the 23rd Light Horse Regiments (Barossa) as the 6th Cavalry Brigade (Australia). This coincided with a numerical change as part of the Kitchener Report, the 16th & 17th becoming the 22nd (SAMR) and 24th (Flinders) LH for a brief period as the 8th LH Brigade (SA). The three Regiments provided the base of the members required to raise the 3rd & 9th Light Horse Regiments for overseas service with the 1st AIF First Australian Imperial Force upon the outbreak of the First World War. During the war, these two regiments fought at Gallipoli as dismounted infantry, before taking part in the Sinai and Palestine campaign, during which the 9th Light Horse had the honour of being one of only 3 Australian units to capture an enemy unit's battle standard, capturing the Turkish 46th Regiment's standard in 1918 at the battle of Kahn near Damascus. The 3rd and 9th Light Horse Regiments returned to Australian in Mar 1919 and where subsequently disbanded as with all of the 1st AIF.

== Post WW1 and WW2 History ==
In 1921, the SA Regiments were expanded and number perpetuated to four the 3rd (SAMR) (Formally the 22nd), 9th (Flinders LH) (formally the 24th), 18th (Adelaide Lancers) was raised and 23rd Light Horse Regiment (Australia) (Barossa LH). By the late 1930s, the Light Horse had undergone various linking and delinking and modernisation of its units, with the 18th LHR converted to a Machine Gun Regiment (MG) in 1936. With the outbreak of World War II another re-organised was required, with the all the Regiments converted to Motor Regiments, then the 3rd & 23rd Regts reducing to Reconnaissance COY/SQNs as part of the 6th Motor Brigade (Australia). The 2nd/9th Armoured Regiment (Second Australian Imperial Force) was newly raised from Volunteers in 1941, and the 12th Armoured Regiment (Militia) raised from the 18th Motor Regt in 1941/2. During late 1942 and into 1943 some militia units where officially disbanded and the forces restructured, by 1945 there were three separate enlistment organisations grouped under the banner of the Australian Military Forces. These included the Permanent Military Force (PMF), the Citizen Military Force (CMF) and the all-volunteer Australian Imperial Force (AIF), which had been raised specifically for expeditionary use during the war.

The 12th Armoured Regiment was formed from the 18th Motor Regiment and was transferred from the Australian Light Horse to the Australian Armoured Corps on 8 May 1942. The regiment, along with the 13th and 14th Armoured Regiments, 9th Motor Regiment and 3rd Reconnaissance Squadron, was allocated to the newly raised 6th Armoured Brigade, itself part of the newly converted 2nd Armoured Division. The 12th Armoured Regiment was initially based in Adelaide. In July 1942, the regiment moved to Puckapunyal with the rest of the 6th Armoured Brigade. By December 1942, the strategic threat to Australia had lessened and the large numbers of armoured units created for the defence of Australia were no longer required, and the 2nd Armoured Division was ordered to disband. While elements of the 6th Armoured Brigade were reallocated to other divisions, the 12th Armoured Regiment was disbanded on 13 February 1943. During this period, some members of the disbanded Armoured Regiments joined the Cavalry Commando Regiments in preparation for Pacific theatre operations.

The 2/9th Armoured Regiment was formed in August 1941 as part of the 1st Armoured Division's 2nd Armoured Brigade upon formation the regiment perpetuated the 9th Light Horse Regiment which had served during World War I. Under the command of Lieutenant Colonel F.E Wells, drawing its personnel from volunteers for overseas service from the states of South Australia and Tasmania. In Sep 1943 the Regiment was reassigned to the 4th Armoured Brigade, which was the Australian Army's specialist jungle warfare armoured unit at the time. It was relocated to Singleton, New South Wales, but was later moved to the Atherton Tablelands in Queensland and in early 1944 it was re-equipped with Matilda II tanks. During this time it undertook infantry co-operation training in preparation for deployment overseas. The 2/9th was to take part in the Borneo campaign Oboe operations, a series of amphibious landings designed to reoccupy areas of the Borneo and the Netherlands East Indies. The regiment would support the 9th Division landings at Tarakan, and then Labuan and Brunei Bay, in British North Borneo. The 2/9th Armoured Regiment remained on Borneo until the end of December, when it returned to Australia and was disbanded at the start of 1946. The 2/9th Armoured Regiment battle honours are emblazed on the Guidon of the 9th LHR.

Lieutenant Colonel Arthur Blackburn, VC, who was CO 18th Light Horse Regiment in 1939, prepared the unit for service overseas in the Second World War, but this did not eventuate. So LTCOL Blackburn and many of the officers and men of the 18th LHR (MG) joined the 2nd Australian Imperial Force's 2/3rd Machine Gun Battalion (Australia), which fought in Syria and later formed part of the ill-fated Black Force in Java. The Colour of the 2/3 MG BN is laid up in St Peters Cathedral beside those of the LHRs.

== Post WW2 History ==
In 1948, following the completion of the demobilisation process after the end of the Second World War, the Citizens Military Force—Australia's part-time volunteer army—was re-organised, albeit on a reduced scale. At this time, the 3rd/9th Armoured Car Regiment (South Australian Mounted Rifles) was re-formed in Adelaide in order to perpetuate the previously existing South Australian light horse and Armoured regiments.

Upon Unit re-establishment in 1948 the unit adopted the Staghound armoured car, which it operated until 1956. At this time, the Australian Army, following the British Army's lead, decided that armoured units would be tasked with anti-tank defence. As a result of this, the regiment was converted to an anti-tank regiment, equipped with Land Rover four wheel drives and 6-pounder static and towed 17-pounder anti-tank guns. This was only short-lived, however. In 1957, amidst widescale cutbacks in the RAAC, the regiment was close to disbandment. In order to save it from extinction, it was converted to an armoured reinforcement group, however, it never trained in this role and in 1960, when the Army adopted the Pentropic organisation, it reverted to the anti-tank role as 3/9 South Australian Mounted Rifles.

After the abandonment of the Pentropic organisation in 1965, the regiment converted to the cavalry role, equipped with Staghounds, Ferret scout cars and Saracen armoured personnel carriers.

In 1976, the regiment was reduced to a Squadron and was equipped with the M113 Armoured Personnel Carrier, which it operated in the armoured reconnaissance role and then the APC role from 1988. In the early 1990s, the Light Horse title was re-added to the Units name to maintain historical lineage and the allocation of unit colour patches (UCPs). The colour of the senior South Australian Regiment the 3rd Light Horse was adopted, being black over white, with the BDE colour white leading. The unit also reverted to the reconnaissance role.

In 2006, the unit converted from the reconnaissance role in armoured personnel carriers to the light cavalry role; in doing so it transitioned from the M113 APCs and began operating in Land Rover four and six wheel drive vehicles. In 2014, the unit transitioned to Protected lift capability and operated the Bushmaster Protected Mobility Vehicle - Medium (PMV-M) whilst continuing dismounted Light Cavalry Operations, under direct command of the 10/27 BN Royal South Australia Regiment. In Nov 2022, 3/9 LH went under direct command of 1st Armoured Regiment and in 2025 was re-equipped with the Hawkei (PMV-L) and G-Wagon SRV and recommenced conducting mounted cavalry operations. Since establishment many members of the 3/9 LH have been attached to other Units and contingents and have seen active service in overseas conflicts in South-East Asia, East Timor, Solomon Islands, Iraq and Afghanistan, as well as Domestic Operations.

== Battle honours ==
The 3rd/9th Light Horse (South Australian Mounted Rifles) perpetuates the following Battle and theatre honours of the Australian Army from its predecessor units:

South Australian Mounted Rifles & South Australian Bushman's Contingent were awarded the following battle and theatre honours to the 16th and 17th Australian Light Horse Regiments:

Second Boer War - "South Africa 1899–1902";

The 3rd Light Horse Regiment was awarded the following battle and theatre honours:

World War I - Anzac, "Defence of Anzac", Suvia, "Sari-Bair", "Gallipoli 1915", "Rumani", "Maghdaba-Rafa", Egypt 1915-1917, "Gaza-Beersheba", El Mughar, Nebi Samwill, "Jerusalem", "Jaffa", "Jericho", Jordan (Es Salt), "Jordan (Amman)", "Meggido", Nablus and Palestine 1917-1918. Those battle and theatre honours shown in parentheses are emblazoned upon the Regimental Guidon.

The 9th Light Horse Regiment was awarded the following battle and theatre honours:

World War I - Anzac, "Defence of Anzac", Suvia, "Sari Bair", Gallipoli 1915, "Rumani", "Maghdaba-Rafah", Egypt 1915-1917, "Gaza-Beersheba", El Mughar, Nebi Samwill, "Jerusalem", "Jordan (Es Salt)", "Megiddo", "Sharon", "Damascus", Palestine 1917-1918. Those battle and theatre honours shown in parentheses are emblazoned on upon Regimental Guidon.

The 18th Light Horse Regiment was awarded the following battle and theatre honours:

World War I - Anzac, Gallipoli 1915, Egypt 1915-1917, Palestine 1917-1918.

The 23rd Light Horse Regiment was awarded the following battle and theatre honours:

World War I - Anzac, Gallipoli 1915, Egypt 1915-1917, Palestine 1917-1918.

The 2/9th Armoured Regiment was awarded the following battle and theatre honours to 3rd/9th South Australian Mounted Rifles:

World War II - South-West Pacific 1945, Tarakan, Labuan, all three are emblazoned upon the 9th LH Regimental Guidon.

== Colours and guidons ==
After the Boer War the 16th and 17th Australian Light Horse Regiments, were presented the King's Colour in 1904. The 16th LHR's colour was carried for many years, but in 1926 it was presented to St Augustine's Church of England, Victor Harbor. A silver plate on the staff of this colour still carried the original inscription ‘Presented by His Most Glorious Majesty, the King Emperor to the 16th Light Horse Regiment in recognition of services rendered to the Empire in South Africa’. The 17th Light Horse King's Colour was presented to the Regiment in 1904 and laid up (then encased in 2001) in St James Church of England, Jamestown, South Australia, 7 June 1925.

The first Regimental flag (emblazed with the state crest of the piping shrike) was presented to the 3rd Light Horse Regiment on September 19, 1914, by the Governor of South Australia at the Morphettville Racecourse in South Australia. The 9th Light Horse Regiment was also presented its banner/flag (a gold over red diagonal separated rectangle, as the Regimental colour patch system had not yet been created by the AIF, where their colours became green over gold) to the Regiment by the Governor, Sir Henry Galway, then paraded up passed Montefiore Hill on 19 November 1914. Both Regiments where presented King's colours on the 25 Sep 1920 by the Governor General Sir Ronald Munro Fergusson on behalf of King George V for service in World War 1. These colours where laid up in 1926, as Guidons where authorised to be issued to all the Light Horse Regiments.

Lieutenant-General Sir HG Harry Chauvel, G.C.M.G, K.C.B, (then chief of the General Staff) presented guidons to the 3rd, 9th, 18th and 23rd Light Horse Regiments at the 6th Cavalry Brigade camp, Gawler on the 25th March 1928. These were laid up at various times between 1942 and 1961.

On Sunday 7th February 1960 the current 3rd and 9th Light Horse Regiments Guidons were presented to the unit by the then Honorary Colonel, LT GEN Sir SF Sydney Rowell, KBE, CB. A ceremonial parade was held on 14 May 1961 when the regiment trooped the old 3rd and 9th Light Horse Regiments Guidons for the last time, laying them up in St Peter's Cathedral.

The following Military colours, standards and guidons of heritage units are laid-up in St Peters Cathedral Adelaide, South Australia:

3rd Light Horse Regiment - 1920 King's Colours - Laid up 1926.

9th Light Horse Regiment - 1920 King's Colours - Laid up 1926.

3rd Light Horse Regiment - 1928 Guidon - laid up May 14th 1961.

9th Light Horse Regiment - 1928 Guidon - laid up May 14th 1961.

18th Light Horse Regiment - 1928 Guidon - laid up Nov 6th 1949.

23rd Light Horse Regiment - 1928 Guidon - laid up Jun 7th 1942.

The following Military colours, standards and guidons of heritage units are laid-up in St Augustine's Church of England, Victor Harbor, South Australia:

16th Light Horse Regiment - 1904 King's Colours - laid up 1926.

The following Military colours, standards and guidons of heritage units are laid-up in St James Church of England, Jamestown, South Australia:

17th Light Horse Regiment - 1904 King's Colours - laid up 7 Jun 1925.

== Alliances ==
- United Kingdom – Royal Dragoon Guards;
- United Kingdom – Queen's Royal Hussars.

== See also ==
- South Australian Mounted Rifles – South Australian contingent to Boer War 1899–1900

== Reference Documents ==
- South Australian Gazette 20 Feb 1840 | Scan of Pg 7 and 8 South Australian Gazette of Thursday 20 Feb 1840 with Government Notice issued by the Colonial Secretary's Office 26 February 1840 involving the forming of the SA Volunteer militia | https://www.samrainc.org/images/Gazette%2020Feb1840-p7.jpg | https://www.samrainc.org/images/Gazette%2020Feb1840-p8.jpg
- South Australian State Register 29 Feb 1840 | Referencing South Australian Gazette of Thursday 20 Feb 1840 with Government Notice to be issued by the Colonial Secretary's Office 26 February 1840 involving the forming of the SA Volunteer militia | https://trove.nla.gov.au/newspaper/article/27441235/2049697
- South Australian Mounted Riles Association Reproduction of the South Australian Gazette | Referencing South Australian Gazette of Thursday 20 Feb 1840 with Government Notice to be issued by the Colonial Secretary's Office 26 February 1840 involving the forming of the SA Volunteer militia | https://www.samrainc.org/Pdf/Foundation%20Document%20Militia%20SA%201840.pdf
- South Australian State Government Record Act No 2 1854 | South Australian Militia act, September 14th 1854 |https://www.legislation.sa.gov.au/home/historical-numbered-as-made-acts/1854/0002-Volunteer-Military-Force-Act-No-2-of-18-Vic,-1854.pdf
- South Australian State Government Record Act No 9 1854 | South Australian Militia act, December 4th 1854 | https://www.legislation.sa.gov.au/home/historical-numbered-as-made-acts/1854/0009-Militia-Act-No-9-of-18-Vic,-1854.pdf
- South Australian State Government Record Act No 17 1859 | South Australian Auxiliary Voluntary act, September 1st 1859 | https://www7.austlii.edu.au/au/legis/sa/num_act/vmfa17o22a23v1859378/vmfa17o22a23v1859378.pdf
- South Australian State Government Record Act No 7 1860 | South Australian Voluntary Military Forces in SA act, October 17th 1860 | https://www7.austlii.edu.au/au/legis/sa/num_act/va7o23a24v1860255/va7o23a24v1860255.pdf
- South Australian State Government Record Act No 14 1860 | South Australian Auxiliary Voluntary act Amendment, October 17th 1860 | https://www7.austlii.edu.au/cgi-bin/viewdb/au/legis/sa/num_act/va14o23a24v1860255/
- South Australian State Government Record Act No 18 1865-6 | South Australian Voluntary act 1865-6, March 16th 1866 | https://www7.austlii.edu.au/cgi-bin/viewdb/au/legis/sa/num_act/vfa18o29v18656281/
- South Australian State Government Record Act No 118 1878 | South Australian Rifle Company's Act, November 30th 1878 | https://www7.austlii.edu.au/au/legis/sa/num_act/rca118o41a42v1878245/rca118o41a42v1878245.pdf
- South Australian State Government Record Act No 125 1878 | South Australian Military Forces Act, November 30th 1878 | https://www7.austlii.edu.au/cgi-bin/viewdb/au/legis/sa/num_act/mfa125o41a42v1878255/
- South Australian State Government Record Act No 390 1886 | South Australian Defence Forces Act, November 17th 1886 | https://www7.austlii.edu.au/cgi-bin/viewdb/au/legis/sa/num_act/dfa390o49a50v1886209/
- South Australian State Government Record Act No 500 1889 | South Australian Defence Forces Act Amendment, December 23rd 1890 | https://www7.austlii.edu.au/cgi-bin/viewdb/au/legis/sa/num_act/dfa500o53a54v1890209/dfa500o53a54v1890209.pdf
- South Australian State Government Record Act No 643 1895 | South Australian Defence Forces Act, December 20th 1895 | https://www7.austlii.edu.au/cgi-bin/viewdb/au/legis/sa/num_act/da643o58a59v1895167/
- South Australian State Government Record GRG 24-51 | South Australian Volunteer Military Forces c1842 - c1870 | https://archives.sa.gov.au/__data/assets/pdf_file/0007/829753/GRG24_51_cso_volunteer-military-and-imperial-troops_0.pdf
- South Australian State Government Record GRG 149-1 | South Australian Nominal Rolls Volunteer Militia 1854 - 1886 | https://archives.sa.gov.au/__data/assets/pdf_file/0009/830178/GRG149_1_Nominal-rolls-Volunteer-Military-Force.pdf
- South Australian State Government Act Archive 1837 onwards | https://www7.austlii.edu.au/cgi-bin/viewtoc/au/legis/sa/num_act/1837
