= 1st Armoured Regiment (Australia) =

Armoured regiment of the Australian Army

- Cap badge of the 1st Armoured Regiment
- Active: 7 July 1949 – present
- Country: Australia
- Allegiance: Royal Tank Regiment
- Branch: Australian Army
- Type: Armoured
- Role: Experimentation
- Size: One regiment
- Part of: Forces Command
- Garrison/HQ: RAAF Base Edinburgh, South Australia
- Mottos: Latin: Paratus ("Prepared")
- March: Quick—Radetski; Slow—Grand March from Aida
- Anniversaries: Unit Birthday-7 July 1949 (Per Army Headquarters Directive 20/7/1949) Cambrai Day-20 November 1917
- Engagements: Vietnam War
- Decorations: Unit Citation for Gallantry (C SQN)
- Battle honours: Theatre Honours: Vietnam 1968-1972 Battle Honours: Coral‐Balmoral, Hat Dich, Binh Ba.

Commanders
- Colonel-in-Chief: King Charles III (Colonel-in-Chief, RAAC)
- Colonel of the Regiment: Major General Roger Powell AM

Insignia
- Unit colour patch
- Abbreviation: 1AR

1st Armoured Regiment (1AR) is an armoured regiment of the Australian Army and is the senior regiment of the Royal Australian Armoured Corps (RAAC). Formed as an armoured unit in the Australian Regular Army on 7 July 1949, the regiment squadrons served during the Vietnam War operating Centurion tanks. More recently the regiment has contributed small groups and individuals to operations in East Timor, Iraq, Afghanistan, the Solomon Islands and elsewhere. Currently the unit is based in Edinburgh, South Australia and was re-roled in 2024 as an experimentation unit.

== History ==
=== Formation ===
The 1st Armoured Regiment was raised as a regular unit on 7 July 1949 at Puckapunyal in Victoria. It was raised from the 1st Armoured Car Squadron, which had returned from occupation duties in Japan a few months earlier. Consequently, the reserve Citizens Military Forces (CMF) unit also named the 1st Armoured Regiment, was retitled as the 1st Royal New South Wales Lancers to perpetuate its unit history and battle honours. (Note: The 1st Armoured Regiment (Royal New South Wales Lancers) had been reconstituted on 1 April 1948 following the re-raising of the post-war CMF in 1948. The unit had previously served during the Second World War as a tank formation, while its lineage included units that had served during the First World War and Second Boer War. Later, in 1956 the 1st Royal New South Wales Lancers merged with the 15th Northern River Lancers to form the 1st/15th Royal New South Wales Lancers.) Upon establishment, the regiment constituted only one squadron, A Squadron, under the command of Major Cecil Ives. Formal affiliation with the Royal Tank Regiment (RTR) was recognised in 1959 and the regiment adopted their regimental colours of Brown, Red and Green, which date back to the Battle of Cambrai during the First World War in 1917. These same colours had also been used by the Australian Tank Corps prior to the Second World War.

Initially the new regiment was equipped with Second World War era Churchill tanks, although this was only a temporary measure until Centurion tanks could be acquired. Due to the perceived unsuitability of the Churchill and the late arrival of the new platform, the regiment was not deployed as part of Australia's commitment to the Korean War, although a number of officers served on exchange with British and US formations and the unit provided machine-gunners and signalers to Australian infantry battalions as reinforcements. The first Centurions finally began arriving in June 1952, with the regiment receiving 39 tanks. With the numbers of regular personnel steadily growing, it was possible to raise Regimental Headquarters, Headquarters Squadron and B Squadron, and the regiment was fully raised by 8 September 1952 under the command of Lieutenant Colonel Stuart Graham.

Meanwhile, in September 1952 another tank squadron was raised. This was known as Nucleus Squadron and was based in Holsworthy, New South Wales, with the purpose of forming the basis of a second tank unit which was to be named the 2nd Armoured Regiment. In 1954 the regiment received it first Ferret MK 1 Scout Car, enabling the raising of Reconnaissance Troop. The following year 1st Armoured Regiment received the Saracen Armoured Personnel Carrier, and it was at this time that the intention to form another tank unit was abandoned, and Nucleus Squadron subsequently returned to the regiment as its third squadron, designated C Squadron.

On 6 February 1956, the then Governor General, Field Marshal Sir William Slim, presented the regiment with its Guidon at a Regimental Parade held in Puckapunyal. Also in 1956 the regiment was equipped with the Centurion armoured recovery vehicle, allowing the retirement of the Churchill recovery vehicle. Under the Pentropic restructure, the regular elements of the RAAC were required to grow to support the new divisions to be formed under this concept. Consequently, in 1960 A Squadron was disbanded, reducing the regiment to two squadrons. The majority of the squadron's personnel formed the basis of regular 'A' Squadrons in the 4th/19th Prince of Wales' Light Horse and the 2nd/14th Light Horse (Queensland Mounted Infantry), which were predominantly CMF formations. These squadrons subsequently formed the nucleus of the 1st Cavalry Regiment, later redesignated the 2nd Cavalry Regiment, and the 4th Cavalry Regiment.

=== Vietnam War ===
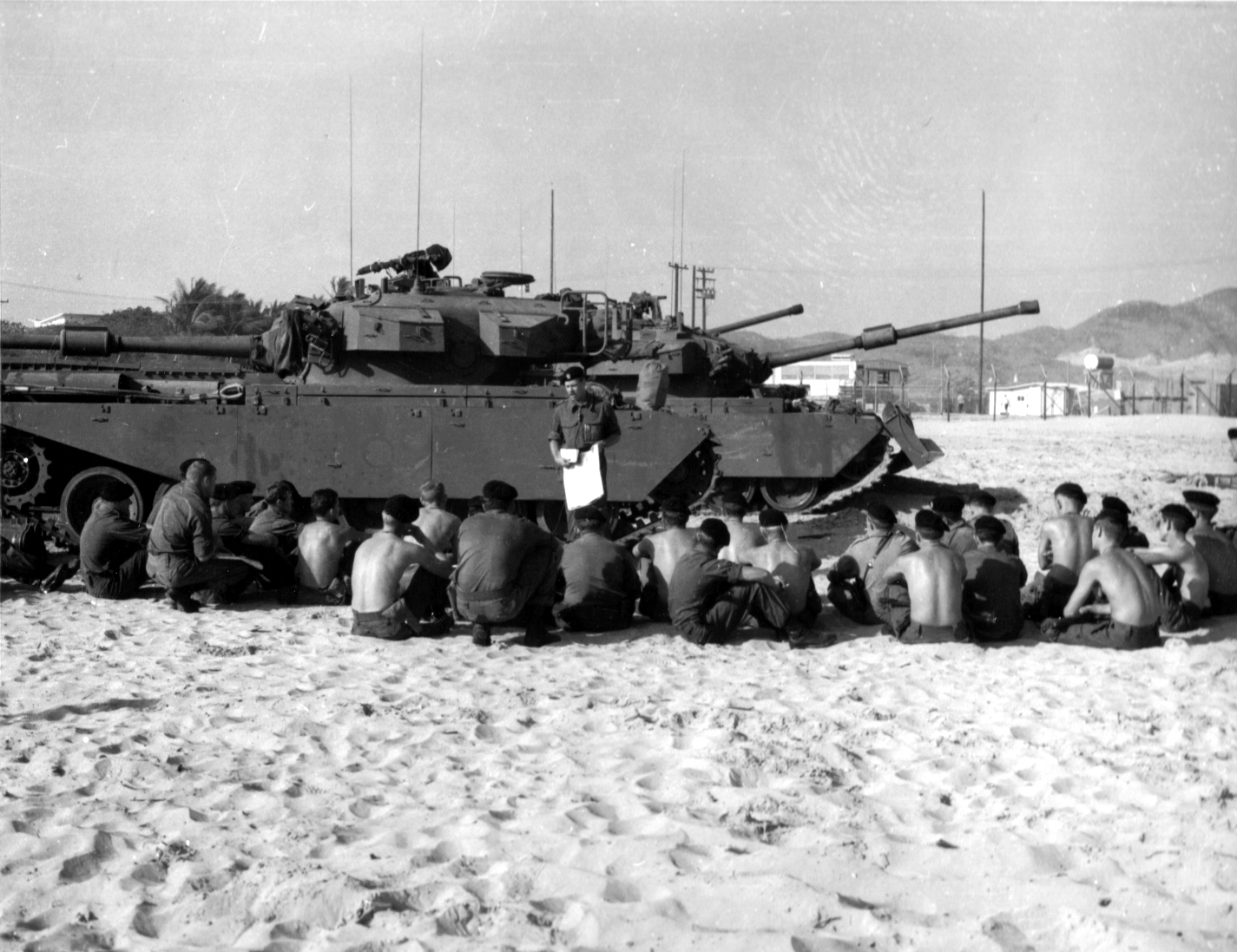
Soldiers of the 1st Armoured Regiment are briefed while sitting in front of their Centurion tanks at Vung Tau in South Vietnam during 1968

The regiments line squadrons each served in the Vietnam War, generally completing 12-month tours of duty. During the early stages of the war, the regiment had provided personnel to 1 Troop, A Squadron, 4th/19th Prince of Wales Light Horse, which was deployed on active service to South Vietnam in May. This troop was hurriedly equipped with the then new M113A1 Armoured Personnel Carrier (APC). In October 1967 the Australian government announced it would increase the size of the 1st Australian Task Force (1 ATF) at Nui Dat in Phuoc Tuy Province from two to three infantry battalions, while additional supporting arms, including a tank squadron would also be added to the force. In February 1968, C Squadron was sent to Vietnam, however, two of its four tank troops were initially held back until the Centurions had proved themselves capable of operating in the conditions. The tank squadron reached full strength of 20 Centurion tanks on 5 September 1968. Over the course of the war the regiments squadrons worked closely with A and B Squadrons of 3rd Cavalry Regiment, equipped with APCs. These provided armoured mobility to the infantry as well as the conduct of cavalry tasks. Meanwhile, in Australia, the regiment had again reached full strength in May, with A Squadron re-raised in order to meet the ongoing operational commitment.

Over the next four years the regiment's squadrons provided invaluable close support to the infantry, particularly during the clearance of Viet Cong bunker systems. Although their value in Vietnam was originally questioned by some, they proved a powerful weapon in both offence and defence, and were responsible for limiting infantry casualties. The Centurions were able to move through the countryside more easily than expected and although they were vulnerable to anti-tank weapons and mines, their firepower and shock action had a decisive effect on the battlefield. In late-May 1968 the tanks played a significant role in the Battle of Coral–Balmoral. Occupying blocking positions in an attempt to thwart an impending communist offensive aimed at influencing the peace-talks, 1ATF deployed two battalions away from its base in Phuoc Tuy, subsequently developing Fire Support Base Coral north-east of Saigon, just east of Lai Khe on 12 May.

Following several regimental-sized assaults on Coral which were successfully repelled by the Australians with heavy casualties on both sides, 1ATF moved to establish Fire Support Base Balmoral on 24–25 May, 6 kilometres (3.7 mi) north of Coral. The infantry were this time supported by Centurion tanks which had been called forward by road from Nui Dat and had arrived just hours before Balmoral was subjected to a two battalion attack. Following a very accurate rocket and mortar barrage at 03:45 hours on 26 May, the base was assaulted by North Vietnamese infantry. The attack was repelled with heavy casualties by the combined firepower of the tanks and infantry. The next day the Australians at Coral assaulted a number of bunkers located just outside the base, with a troop of Centurions supported by infantry destroying the bunkers and their occupants without loss. A second attack, again of regimental strength, was made against Balmoral at 02:30 hours on 28 May but was called off after only 30 minutes. The North Vietnamese were soundly defeated—again by the supporting fires of tanks, artillery and mortars—leaving 55 dead and resulted in six prisoners. Australian losses were one killed and six wounded. This performance demonstrated the advantage of using armour in Vietnam, and whereas before the battle some infantry had doubted the usefulness or necessity of the Centurions, after the battle the infantry did not like working without them. For its involvement in the fighting at Coral–Balmoral, 'C' Squadron was awarded a Unit Citation for Gallantry in 2018.

In February 1969, C Squadron was relieved by B Squadron. On 6–7 June, B Squadron was involved in a fierce action during the Battle of Binh Ba, a village 5 kilometres (3.1 mi) north of Nui Dat. The attack began on the morning of 6 June when Australian tanks and APCs advanced with infantry from D Company, 5th Battalion, Royal Australian Regiment (5 RAR) towards the village which was being occupied by the Viet Cong and North Vietnamese. As the battle continued, B Company, 5 RAR took up a blocking position to prevent them from escaping. During fierce urban fighting the infantry were forced to clear each house, while the Communist troops occupying the houses fired on them from the windows and doorways before retreating into tunnels as the Australians passed. Each time the infantry were fired on, the tanks would blast a hole in the wall of the building, through which small teams could then enter and clear the structure of any opposition. The fighting continued throughout the afternoon, and resumed the next day before the Australians successfully cleared the village, the bulk of which was destroyed. One Australian was killed and 10 wounded, while communist losses included at least 107 killed, six wounded and eight captured.

In December 1969, owing to the rotation system B Squadron was re-designated A Squadron, while in December 1970 A Squadron was in turn re-designated C Squadron. By late-1970 Australia was beginning to reduce its commitment to the war and the size of 1ATF was again reduced from three infantry battalions to two. The tanks, however, continued operations and were involved in heavy fighting at Long Khanh on 6–7 June 1971, as well as numerous smaller actions. The last elements of the regiment were subsequently withdrawn from Vietnam in September 1971. A total of 58 Centurions had served in Vietnam; 42 had suffered battle damage, of which six were beyond repair, while two crewmen had been killed in action.

=== 1970s ===
The years immediately following the Vietnam War were traumatic for the Australian Army and the regiment. The abolition of National Service after the end of Australian involvement in Vietnam depleted the regiments strength to the point where training was severely restricted until it was finally reinforced during 1974. Although various restructures occurred in this period, such as the RAAC Regiment and the Standard Infantry Division, the regiment was retained serving as Army's sole armoured regiment following the conversion of the CMF 1st/15th Royal New South Wales Lancers and the 8th/13th Victorian Mounted Rifles to cavalry regiments in 1971. From this time until the early 2010s the regiment was the only combat unit in Army which operated tanks, serving as the centre of excellence for armoured conventional warfare for the service. (Note: The last CMF armoured regiment gave up its tanks in 1971, leaving the regular 1st Armoured Regiment as the only tank unit in the Australian Army.) With the value of heavy armour proven again during the Vietnam War, government endorsed the plan to replace the aged Centurion tank. Subsequently, B Squadron was re-designated as the Medium Tank Trials Unit in 1972 and carried out extensive user and technical trials to evaluate the replacement for the ageing Centurions. In 1977 the Centurion was replaced in service by the Leopard 1, which had been selected over the American built M60 Patton.

=== 1980s–1990s ===
The 1980s and 1990s were a period of both change and continuity. The regiment was pivotal in maintaining Army's armoured/mechanised warfare capability and did so through supporting the mechanisation of 1 Brigade units in the 1980s. Consequently, it participated in many exercises at Puckapunyal in this period practicing and honing its skills in mounted combat. On 21 April 1981, the Colonel-in-Chief of the RAAC, the Prince of Wales (now King Charles III), presented the unit with its first Regimental Standard. However, changes in government policy in the late 1980s placed less emphasis on Army mechanisation and fewer resources were dedicated to the regiment. Consequently, C Squadron became a General Reserve squadron, and B Squadron would later transition to a Ready Reserve squadron in the 1990s. Likewise plans to modernise the Leopard, and or replace it, were not supported. In 1995 as part of the broader Army Presence in the North Plan, the regiment moved from Puckapunyal to Darwin and was based at Robertson Barracks alongside the 2nd Cavalry Regiment which had moved several years earlier. The other elements of 1st Brigade would relocate to Darwin by the end of the decade resulting in all the units consolidating in a single location for the first time. In this period the regiment conducted a cycle of squadron, regiment and brigade training exercises and activities, such as the Predator series and Exercise Croc West. This were conducted across the north of Australia in testing conditions but demonstrated the ability of armoured/mechanised forces to operate in this challenging environment. The regiment also supported Exercise Phoenix 98, which tested the doctrine and organisational structures of the Restructuring the Army trial, a product of the Army 21 concept. During the 1999 East Timor crisis A Squadron was placed on standby to deploy in the event the conflict escalated. While this did not occur, members of the regiment subsequently deployed to supplement other organisations within INTERFET and later as part of UNTAET.

=== 2000s ===
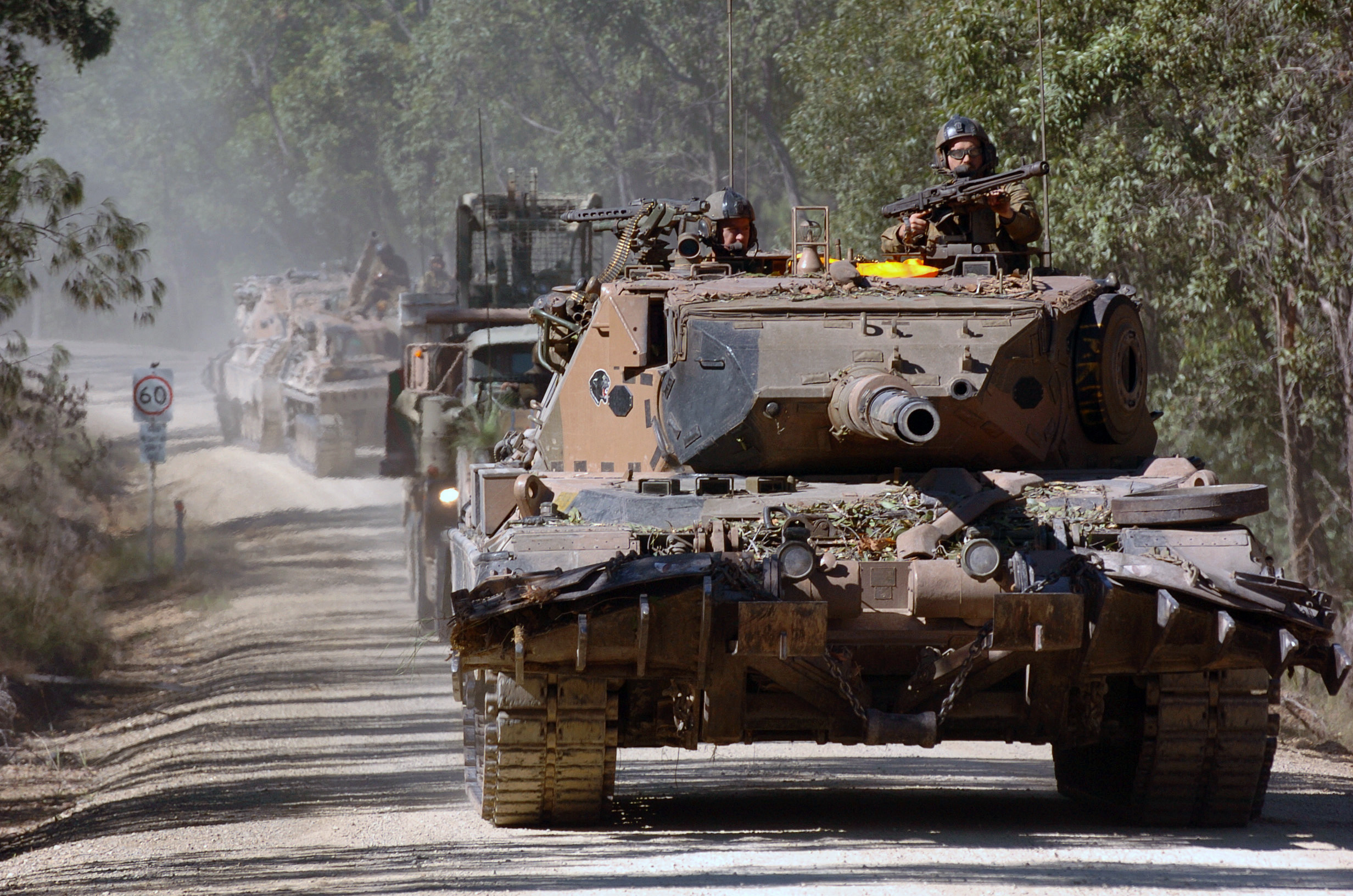
A Leopard AS1 MBT of the 1st Armoured Regiment during an exercise in Queensland in 2005.

In the early 2000s the regiment underwent a period of rebuilding. Gradually it regrew to a three-line squadron regiment with C Squadron transitioning from a GRES sub-unit to a regular one and return of a Headquarters Squadron incorporating Command Troop, Reconnaissance Troop and Special Equipment Troop. In this period small groups and individuals of the regiment served on Operation Relex on border protection tasks, in East Timor, Bougainville, Sinai and the Solomon Islands. The regiment's current standard was presented by the then Governor General, Dr. Peter Hollingworth on 13 July 2002, at a mounted parade held in Darwin. While some efforts had been made to improve crew conditions on the Leopard in the late 1990s and enhance its night fighting capability, the lack of upgrades to it had rendered it obsolete by the early 2000s. With a change in government policy articulated in the 2000 Defence White Paper, the September 11 attacks and the subsequent invasion of Iraq in 2003, momentum built to replace the Leopard tank. Following government direction and a rapid acquisition, after 30 years of service the Leopard was replaced by 59 M1A1 Abrams Integrated Management Situational Awareness (M1A1 AIM SA) main battle tanks, with the occasion marked by a mounted parade on 26 July 2007. The regiment was equipped with 41 M1 Tanks and 3 M88A2 Hercules Armoured Recovery Vehicles with the remaining vehicles issued to the School of Armour for individual training. The M1A1 provided a contemporary credible, deployable and sustainable tank capability for Army which provided the basis of its mechanised combat power. However, concurrent personnel pressures once again resulted in the disbandment of C Squadron in 2008.

=== Iraq War 2003–2020 ===
Although the regiment did not contribute collective capabilities, individual members deployed to the Iraq War in various roles. These included as Bushmaster PMV crews within the various rotations of the Al Muthanna Task Group and Overwatch Battle Group-West, trainers as part of the Australian Army Training Team-Iraq and as embedded staff and advisors within various headquarters under the auspices of Operation Catalyst. Under the later Operation Okra members would again serve as trainers and advisors within Task Group Taji to help build the capacity of the Iraqi Security Forces. Importantly, the regiment led and formed the basis of the Taji Training Unit within Task Group Taji IV deploying from December 2016 to June 2017.

=== Afghanistan War 2001–2021 ===
From 2008 troop size rotations were deployed in support of the Special Operations Task Group during the Afghanistan War. These troops commanded and drove Bushmaster PMVs which provided protected mobility to special operations elements. Given the nature and composition of the larger deployments of Australian forces on the Reconstruction Task Force, Mentoring and Reconstruction Task Force and Mentoring Task Forces, which arguably did not warrant the deployment of heavy armour, the SOTG rotations provided an opportunity for junior members of the regiment to gain operational experience. During the 2010-2011 period a large number of unit personnel deployed either as part of Headquarters Combined Team Uruzghan or as part of Mentoring Task Force 2.

=== 2010s ===
Until 2013 the regiment provided the basis for one of three battlegroups within Army's mechanised 1st Brigade, which also included a cavalry regiment, two mechanised infantry battalions, a mechanised combat engineer regiment and a medium artillery regiment. However, under the Plan Beersheba reorganisation announced in 2011 and confirmed in the 2013 Defence White Paper, the three Regular Army brigades were restructured between 2014 and 2017 into three Combat Brigades with a similar structure and capabilities, each consisting of: a Brigade Headquarters, an Armoured Cavalry Regiment (ACR), two Standard Infantry Battalions, an Artillery Regiment, a Combat Engineer Regiment, a Combat Service Support Battalion and a Combat Signals Regiment. The regiment was directed to serve as the trial unit for this concept and adopted the ACR structure for Exercise Hamel 2013, grouping elements from 2d Cavalry Regiment for this task. Consequently, the unit was reorganised as one of three ACRs assigned to the Army's combat brigades in Brisbane, Darwin and Townsville.

As an ACR, the unit was structured as: a Regimental Headquarters (with a reduced Headquarters Squadron capability), an Armoured Squadron equipped with M1 tanks, a Cavalry Squadron with ASLAV reconnaissance vehicles, and an Armoured Personnel Carrier Squadron with M113AS4 armoured personnel carriers and a reduced support squadron. This organisation reflected the proposed RAAC Regiment from the 1970s. In late 2015, the disaggregation of the tank capability began with the transfer of one of the 1st Armoured Regiment's two tank squadrons to the Townsville-based 2nd Cavalry Regiment. In late 2017, C Squadron 2/14 Light Horse Regiment converted to an armoured role and was equipped with the M1 tank. In July 2017, the ACR structure was changed under modifications to the Plan Beersheba model. Under workforce alignment the Standard Infantry Battalion structure was abandoned in favour of a return to Motorised and Mechanised Infantry Battalions, resulting in a transfer of the APCs back to the infantry and the conversion of the APC squadron back to cavalry role. However, the paucity of APCs resulted in the pooling and rationing of vehicles across the brigades under Plan Keogh. In October 2017, the regiment moved from Robertson Barracks in Darwin to RAAF Base Edinburgh in South Australia. It joined 7 RAR and other elements, and these would continue to travel north to train with 1st Combat Brigade.

=== 2020s ===
With the reduction in operational commitments to what were primarily stability operations, Army refocused on conventional warfighting in the 2020s. This resulted in the reallocation of the regiment and the other Adelaide-based elements of 1st Brigade to the 9th Brigade, a Reserve formation, in 2022. Under the Army Objective Force plan the 9th Combat Brigade would become an integrated formation incorporating the 1st Armoured Regiment, the 7th Battalion, Royal Australian Regiment, 144th Signal Squadron and elements of the 1st Combat Service Support Battalion alongside its reserve elements. Under this plan 9th Brigade would be Army's heavy formation equipped with a suite of modern equipment. Most relevant to the regiment was the upgrade of the 59 M1A1 AIM SA tanks with 75 M1A2 Systems Enhancement Package Version 3 main battle tanks. Approval for this was granted by government on 14 January 2022 with the first tanks planned to arrive in mid-late 2024. On 27 October 2022, the Army Reserve A Squadron 3rd/9th Light Horse (South Australian Mounted Rifles) was allocated as a direct command sub-unit to 1st Armoured Regiment.

However, following the change of government and publication of the Defence Strategic Review in April 2023 the Army Objective Force structure was no longer considered viable. Consequently, in September 2023 Army announced a new force structure. Under this the Townsville-based 3rd Combat Brigade would now become an armoured brigade, 7th Combat Brigade a motorised brigade and 1st Brigade a light combat brigade. 1st Armoured Regiment The 9th Combat Brigade would revert to a reserve formation and focus on a security role. Consequently, 1st Armoured Regiment would be converted to an experimental unit, with the role of trialing new technologies. As a result, Army's armoured capability would be concentrated in two squadrons within the 2nd Cavalry Regiment in Townsville. 1st Armoured Regiment will now focus on test and evaluation activities to introduce capability into service. While, many members of A and B Squadrons will be posted to other RAAC units, C Squadron of the 1st Armoured Regiment was allocated the experimentation role. In this role it has conducted trials with new technologies such as unmanned ground vehicles (UGVs), small unmanned aerial systems (SUAS) and remote weapons systems (RWS) at Puckapunyal.

== Organisation ==
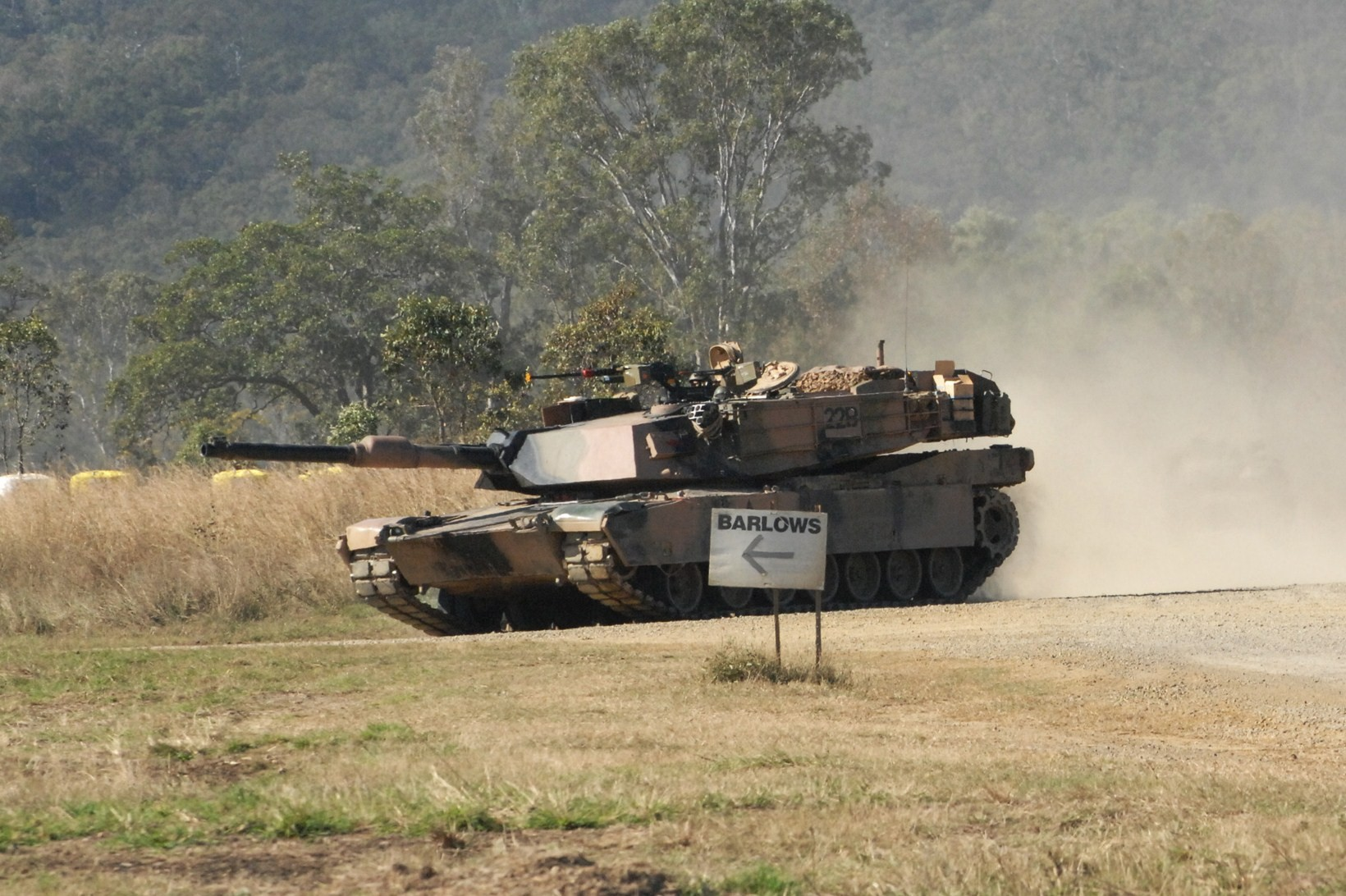
A 1st Armoured Regiment Abrams tank in 2011

From December 2017 the regiment was organised as follows:

- Headquarters Squadron
- A Squadron – Cavalry (equipped with ASLAV) (Note: Between 2015 and 2017, A Squadron was equipped with M113AS4 Armoured Personnel Carriers under the initial Plan Beersheba force structure.)
- B Squadron – Tank (equipped with M1A1 Abrams)
- C Squadron – Cavalry (equipped with ASLAV)
- A Squadron – 3rd/9th Light Horse (South Australian Mounted Rifles) (Reserve, equipped with Hawkei)
- Support Squadron

== Battle honours ==
- Vietnam War: Coral–Balmoral, Hat Dich, Binh Ba, Vietnam 1965–72.

== Alliances ==
- United Kingdom – Royal Tank Regiment
