= 6th (Manawatu) Mounted Rifles =

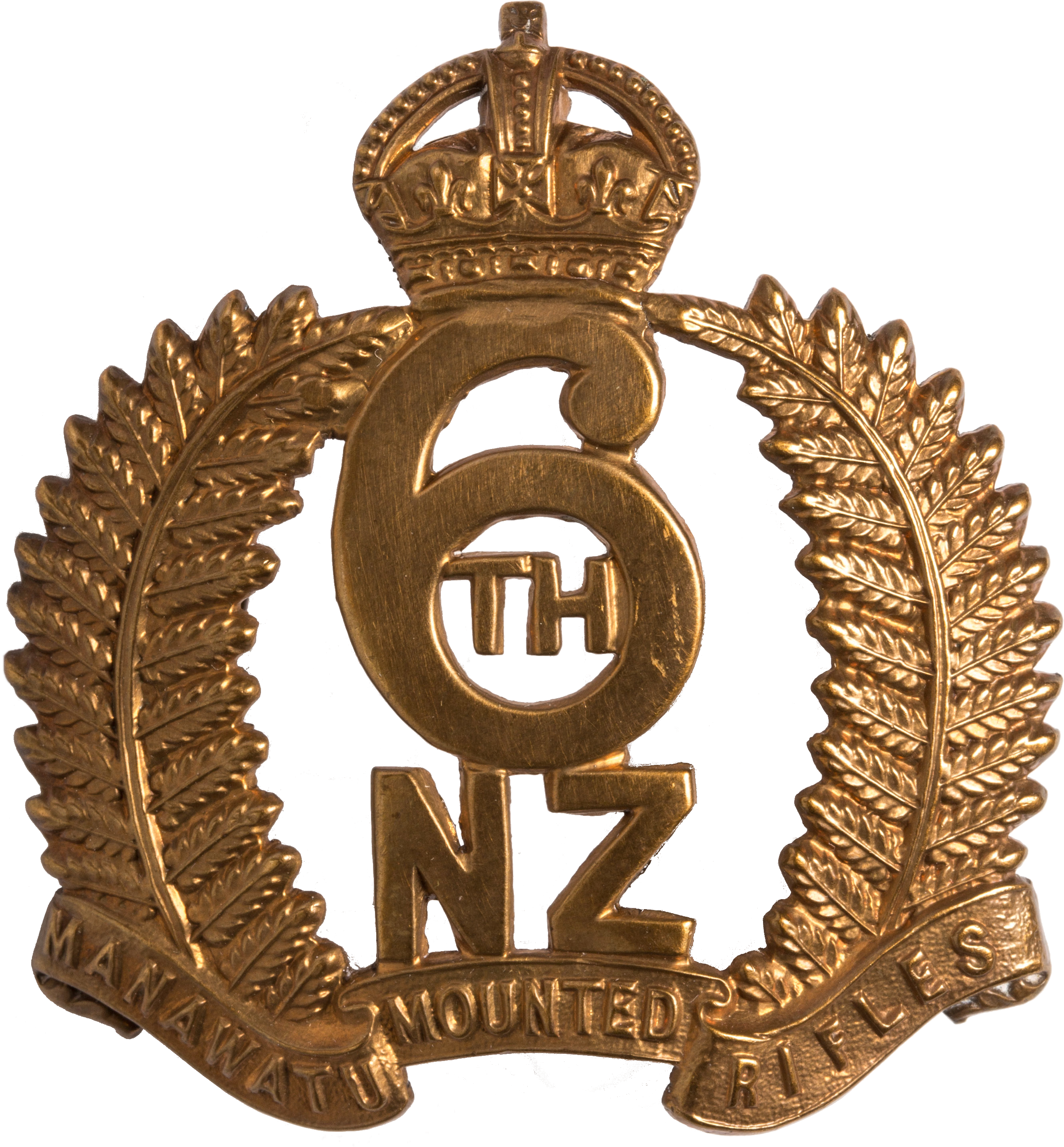
- Cap badge of the 6th (Manawatu) Mounted Rifles
- Active: 1911–1921
- Country: New Zealand
- Allegiance: New Zealand Crown
- Branch: New Zealand Army
- Role: Mounted
- Size: Regiment
- Part of: New Zealand Mounted Rifles Brigade
- Engagements: World War I

Commanders
- Honorary Colonel: Admiral of the Fleet John Jellicoe

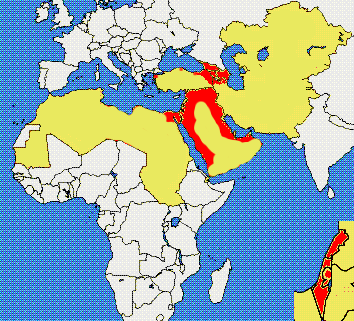
Middle Eastern Theatre during the Great War

The 6th (Manawatu) Mounted Rifles was formed on March 17, 1911. They were mobilised during World War I as a squadron of the Wellington Mounted Rifles Regiment. They served in the Middle Eastern theatre of World War I and first saw action during the Battle of Gallipoli. As a part of the larger New Zealand Mounted Rifles Brigade (of the ANZAC Mounted Division), they went on to serve in the Sinai and Palestine Campaign.

== Great War battles ==
- Battle of Gallipoli
- Battle of Romani
- Battle of Magdhaba
- Battle of Rafa.
- First Battle of Gaza
- Second Battle of Gaza
- Third Battle of Gaza
- Battle of Beersheba
- Battle of Megiddo (1918)

== Between the wars ==
Admiral of the Fleet John Jellicoe was appointed honorary colonel of the Regiment in 1923. The regiment was renamed the 6th New Zealand Mounted Rifles (Manawatu) in 1921 and later to the simple Manawatu Rifles, which was absorbed into 2nd Armoured Regiment on 29 March 1944.

== Notable unit members ==
- Major Norman Frederick Hastings, DSO, mid, Légion d'honneur, Officer Commanding the 6th (Manawatu) Squadron, Wellington Mounted Rifles Regiment who died of wounds after the attack on Chunuk Bair, Gallipoli in August 1915.

== Alliances ==
- United Kingdom – 5th Royal Inniskilling Dragoon Guards
