= Arthur Owen Vaughan =

Welsh writer (1863–1919)

Lieutenant Colonel Arthur Owen Vaughan DSO, OBE, DCM
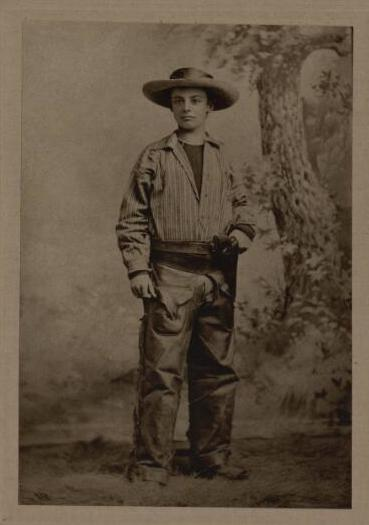
- Arthur Owen Vaughan, c. 1880
- Born: Robert Scowfield Mills; 6 September 1863; Southport, Lancashire, England
- Died: 15 October 1919 (aged 56)
- Resting place: St Thomas' Church, Rhyl, Flintshire
- Other name: Owen Rhoscomyl
- Occupations: Writer, soldier
- Known for: Welsh nationalism, writing
- Notable work: Flame-Bearers of Welsh History: Being the outline of the Sons of Cunedda
- Spouse: Katharina Louisa (Katherine Lois) Geere
- Children: 4
- Awards: Distinguished Service Order, Order of the British Empire, Distinguished Conduct Medal

Lt. Colonel Arthur Owen Vaughan, DSO, OBE, DCM (6 September 1863 – 15 October 1919), also known by his bardic name Owen Rhoscomyl, was an English-born writer, soldier and Welsh nationalist. Born as Robert Scowfield Mills in England, Owen Rhoscomyl was influenced by his Welsh grandmother and became a notable patriot to Wales and its history.

== Early life ==
Vaughan was born in Southport, Lancashire, but moved to Droylsden, Lancashire where he was raised. As a child, Vaughan was highly influenced by his maternal grandmother, who was born in Tremeirchion in North Wales. At the age of 15 he ran away from home and went to sea, travelling to America. There he became a cowboy and found work in mining camps before returning to Britain.

== Military career ==
In 1887 he joined the 1st (Royal) Dragoons. He left the Royal Dragoons in 1890 but served again in the British Army in the Boer War of 1899–1902. Vaughan served in several horse troops, mainly in Rimington's Guides and their successor unit Damant's Horse. While in this unit, Sergeant Vaughan was mentioned for bravery under fire and awarded the DCM. In October 1901 he joined Ross's Canadian Scouts, an anti-commando outfit previously led by Arthur L. Howard, in which Vaughan reached the rank of captain.

When the First World War broke out in August 1914, Vaughan was prominent in recruiting a new regiment in South Wales, the Welsh Horse Yeomanry, hoping - in vain, as it turned out - to be given command. Temporary Lt.-Col. Vaughan of the Labour Corps was awarded the DSO in the 1919 New Year Honours.

== Literary career and later life ==
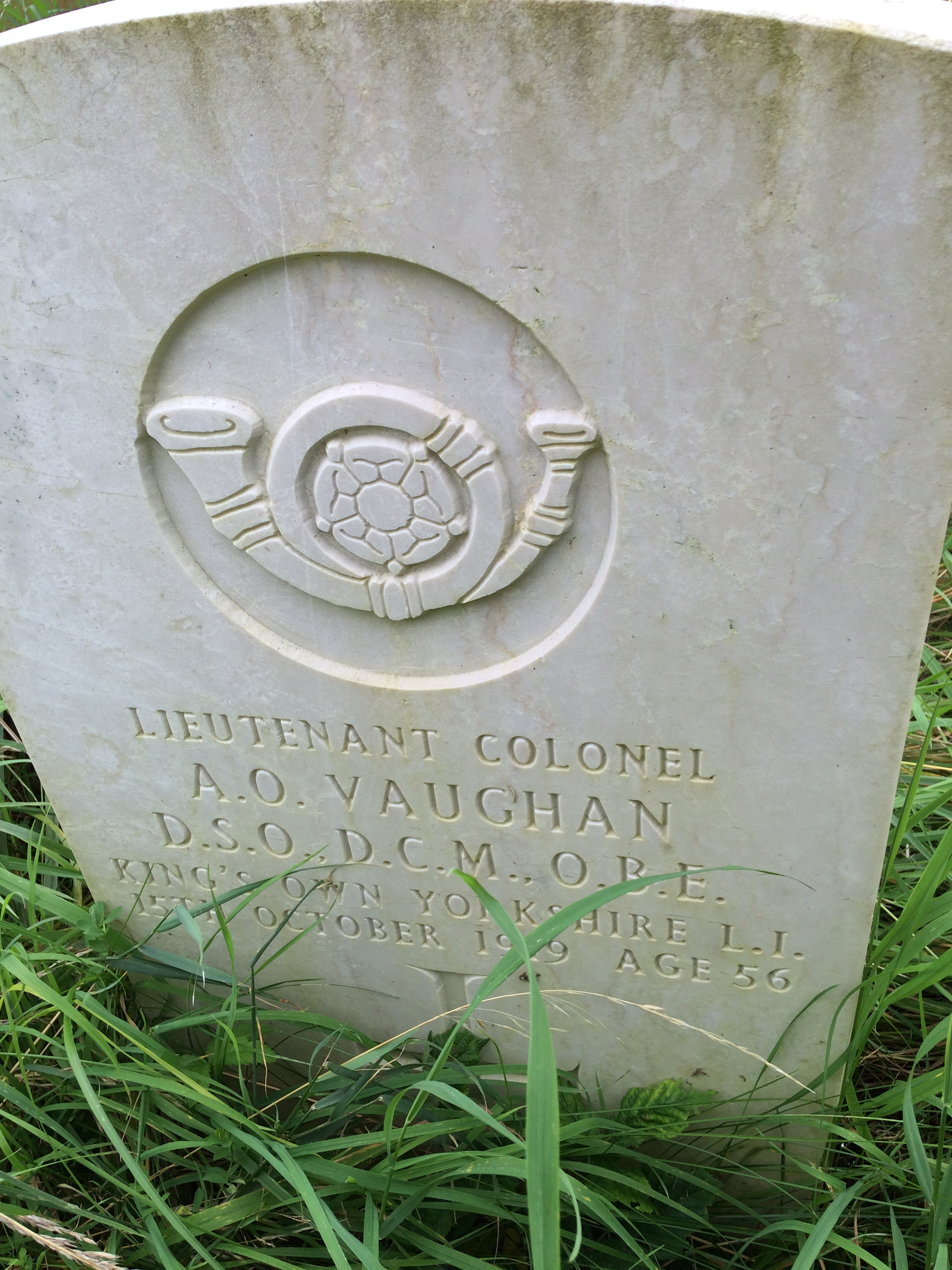
Grave of Lt Col. A. O. Vaughan DSO, DCM, OBE, in Rhyl

While in South Africa, Vaughan met and married Katharina Louisa (Katherine Lois) Geere secretly on the banks of the Vaal River near Parys in December 1901.

On his return to Britain in 1902, Vaughan set out to promote Wales and in 1905 he completed his most famous work Flame-Bearers of Welsh History: Being the outline of the Sons of Cunedda, which looked at the contribution of the Welsh to the growth of the British Empire. In 1906 he wrote the novel Old Fireproof, followed by Vronina (1906) and Lone Tree Lode (1913).

He was a member of Legion of Frontiersmen.

In 1909 Vaughan scripted the National Pageant of Wales, held at Cardiff Castle. In 1911 he scripted the National Pageant at the Investiture of the Prince of Wales in Carnarvon Castle.

He and Katherine had four children. Katherine died in 1927, while Vaughan died in 1919. A fund was raised to provide a memorial for his grave in honour of his Welsh patriotism in St Thomas' Church, Rhyl, Flintshire. Two headstones mark his grave: an Imperial War Graves Commission headstone under the name, Lt Col A. O. Vaughan, with the badge of the King's Own Yorkshire Light Infantry and a Celtic cross honouring his achievements for the Welsh under his bardic name Owen Roscomyl.

== Works ==
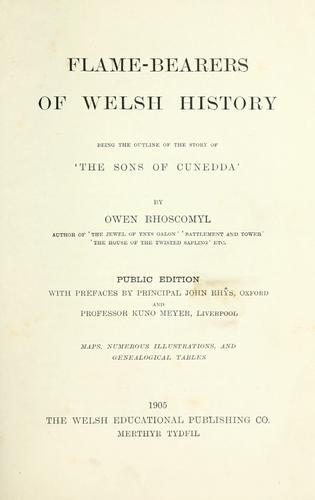
Flame-Bearers of Welsh History: Being the outline of the Sons of Cunedda by Arthur Owen Vaughan

- The Jewel of Ynys Galon (1895)
- Battlement and Tower (1896)
- The White Rose of Arno (1897)
- The Shrouded face (1898)
- Y Rhosin Du (1899)
- The Lady of Castell March (1902)
- Old Hendrik's Tales (1904) co-authored with C. L. Vaughan
- Flame-Bearers of Welsh History: Being the outline of the Sons of Cunedda (1905)
- Sweet Rogues (1907)
- Dewi Saint (1907)
- Old Fireproof (1906)
- Vronina (1907)
- Isle Raven (1908)
- A Scout's Story (1908)
- Ou Hendrik se Stories (1908) translated into Dutch
- Lone Tree Lode (1913)
- The Matter of Wales (1913)
- Numerous short stories (1904-1909)
