= Medium Tank Trials Unit (Australia) =

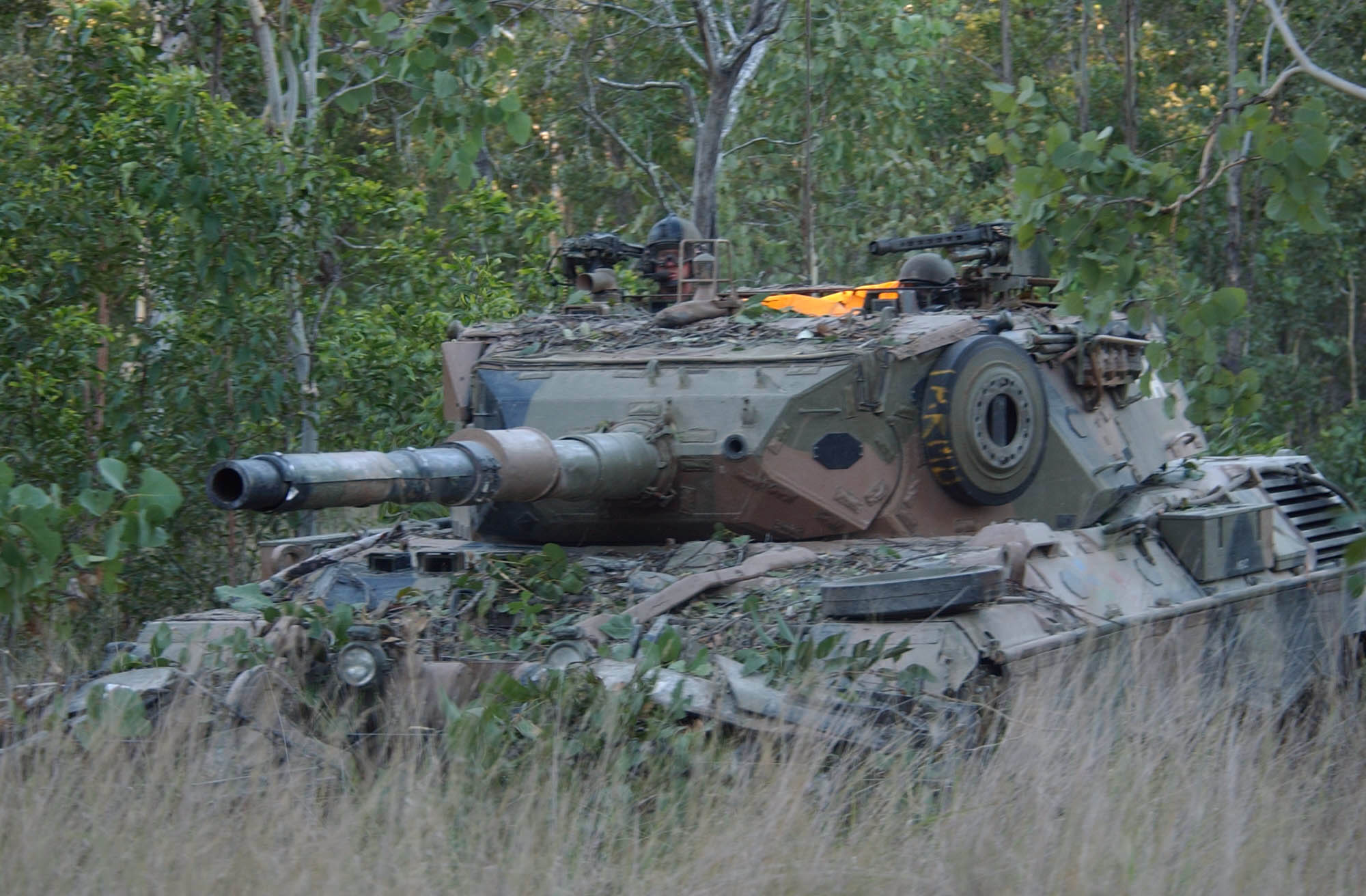
An Australian Leopard AS1 in 2005

The Medium Tank Trials Unit (MTTU) was a temporary Australian Army unit formed to test M60 Patton and Leopard 1 tanks to determine the most suitable replacement for the Army's Centurion tanks. The MTTU was formed in early 1972 by converting B Squadron, 1st Armoured Regiment. The MTTU's personnel were trained in the United States and Germany in early 1972 and received two M60A1 Pattons, two Leopard 1A2s and a Leopard 1 armoured recovery vehicle in the middle of the year. The tank trials commenced in late 1972 and were conducted at Puckapunyal and the Tully - Innisfail region of north Queensland. The trials were completed in March 1973 and the MTTU reverted to B Squadron, 1st Armoured Regiment on 1 June 1973. The Leopard 1 tank was selected on the basis of the results of the trials and entered service with the Australian Army in 1976.
