= Roger Powell (general) =

Australian Army officer

Roger Anthony Powell
- Born: 23 June 1949 (age 77); Canberra, Australian Capital Territory
- Military career
- Allegiance: Australia
- Branch: Australian Army
- Service years: 1968–2002
- Rank: Major General
- Commands: Training Command – Army (1999–01); Peace Monitoring Group (1998–99); 6th Brigade (1993–95); 1st Armoured Regiment (1987–88)
- Conflicts: Bougainville; East Timor
- Awards: Member of the Order of Australia
- Other work: Honorary Colonel Royal Australian Armoured Corps (2009–13); Honorary Colonel 1st Armoured Regiment (2004–13)

Major General Roger Anthony Powell, AM (born 23 June 1949) is a retired senior officer of the Australian Army. His last post was to serve as Deputy Force Commander of the United Nations Transitional Administration in East Timor.

Prior to that position he served as commander of Training Command – Army, and as director general of land development for the Australian Defence Headquarters. In addition, Powell served as commander of the 6th Brigade from 1993 to 1995.

== Education ==
- Bachelor of Arts degree from University of New South Wales in 1971.
- Master's degree in educational psychology from Florida State University in 1978.
