= Rimington's Guides =

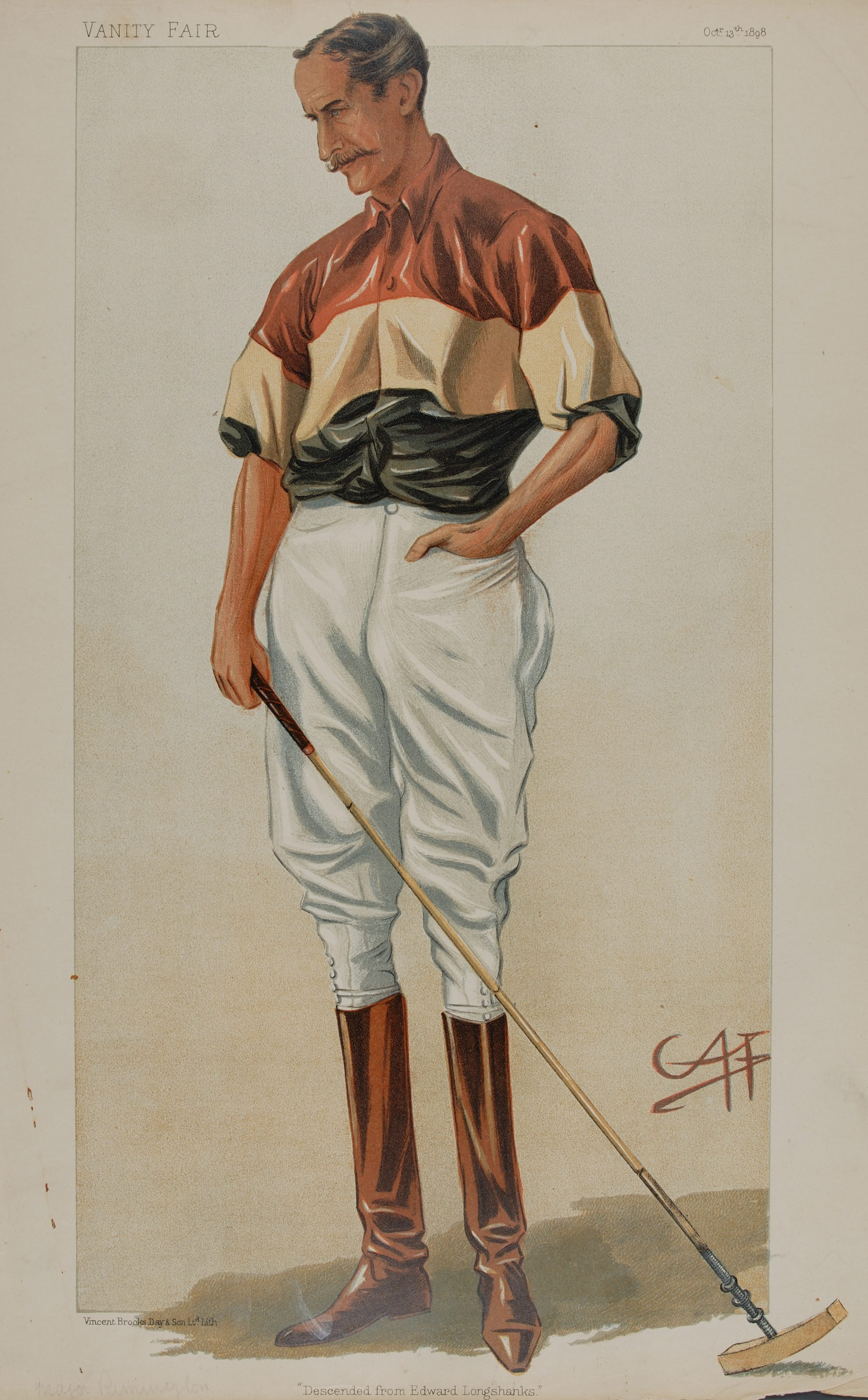
- 1898 caricature of Rimington
- Country: United Kingdom
- Branch: British Army

Commanders
- Major (later Brevet Colonel): Michael Rimington
- Major: Frederick Damant

Rimington's Guides (also known as Rimington's Tigers or Rimington's Corps of Guides and then later as Damant's Horse) were a unit of light horse in the British Army active in the Second Boer War.

== Background ==
They were led by Major M. F. (Mike) Rimington, later Brevet Colonel Rimington CB. He also led a column in the later stages of the war. It was formed in the Cape Colony in 1899 with 150 men. The Rimington's Guides also had the name Rimington's Tigers due to the leopard skin hatbands worn on their slouch hats. Rimington gave his Corps of Guides the nickname "catch-'em-alive-o's while other forces gave him the nickname "The Night Cats" because of their night marches and stealth like movement. Rimington left the Guides in January 1901. The force was reorganised as Damant's Horse under Major Frederic Damant, Rimington's second-in-command, though they were often known by his name through the remainder of the war.

== Composition ==
The unit was recruited from English speaking South Africans. Every man in Rimington's Corps of Guides was obliged to speak Afrikaans and at least one of the indigenous African languages, with many speaking both. They were armed with carbines and pistols, riding light ahead of the main army.

== Notable Unit Members ==
- Corporal John James Clements. Rimington Guides. South African-born recipient of the VC.
- Lieutenant-Colonel Hon. George Henry Morris, (16 July 1872 – 1 September 1914) the first commanding officer to lead an Irish Guards battalion into battle. He was killed in action during the Retreat from Mons when the 4th (Guards) Brigade formed a rear-guard for the 2nd Division in the Forest of Retz near Villers-Cotterêts, France.
- Sergeant Norman Frederick Hastings, later Major Hastings DSO, mid, Légion d'honneur, New Zealand Officer Commanding the 6th (Manawatu) Squadron, Wellington Mounted Rifles Regiment who died of wounds after the attack on Chunuk Bair, Gallipoli in August 1915.
- Sergeant Arthur Owen Vaughan
