= South Australian Mounted Rifles =

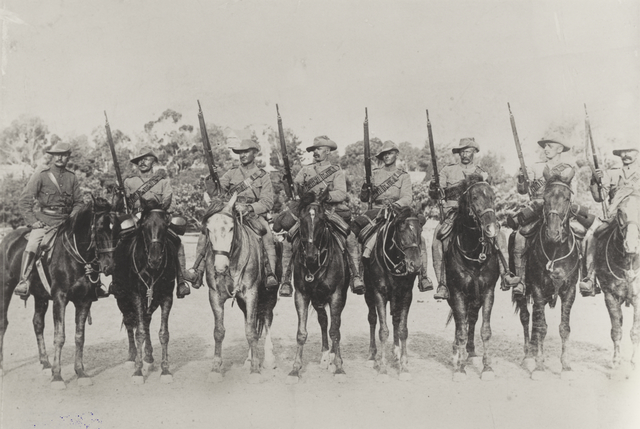
- 2nd South Australian Mounted Rifles training in Adelaide, prior to deployment to South Africa, early 1900. Trooper Harry Morant is third from left.
- Active: 1899–1901
- Country: South Australia
- Allegiance: British Empire
- Type: Mounted infantry
- Size: Initial: 6 officers and 121 men (1st SAMR); 7 officers and 112 men (2nd SAMR)
- Engagements: Second Boer War

The South Australian Mounted Rifles (SAMR) was a mounted infantry unit of the Colony of South Australia that served in the Second Boer War. The first contingent of South Australian Mounted Rifles was raised in 1899, followed by a second contingent in 1900.

The first contingent, an infantry company, arrived in South Africa in late November 1899, and served with the Australian Regiment guarding a railway line. After being mounted, the unit fought in operations around Colesberg, and in the march to Bloemfontein, where it joined the second contingent to form the South Australian Mounted Rifles. The second contingent, a mounted squadron, had arrived in South Africa in late February 1900, participating in the suppression of a Boer uprising before joining the march to Bloemfontein. The SAMR, as part of the 1st Mounted Infantry Brigade, participated in the capture of Johannesburg and Pretoria, the Battle of Diamond Hill, and the Battle of Belfast, the last set-piece battle of the war. After advancing to the eastern border of Transvaal, the first contingent and a small portion of the second contingent returned to Australia in November, while the remainder served in Transvaal until March 1901, when they too returned to Australia.

== History ==
The militia unit with the same name was formed by the merger of the South Australian Adelaide Lancer and mounted rifle militia units in 1895.

=== 1st contingent ===
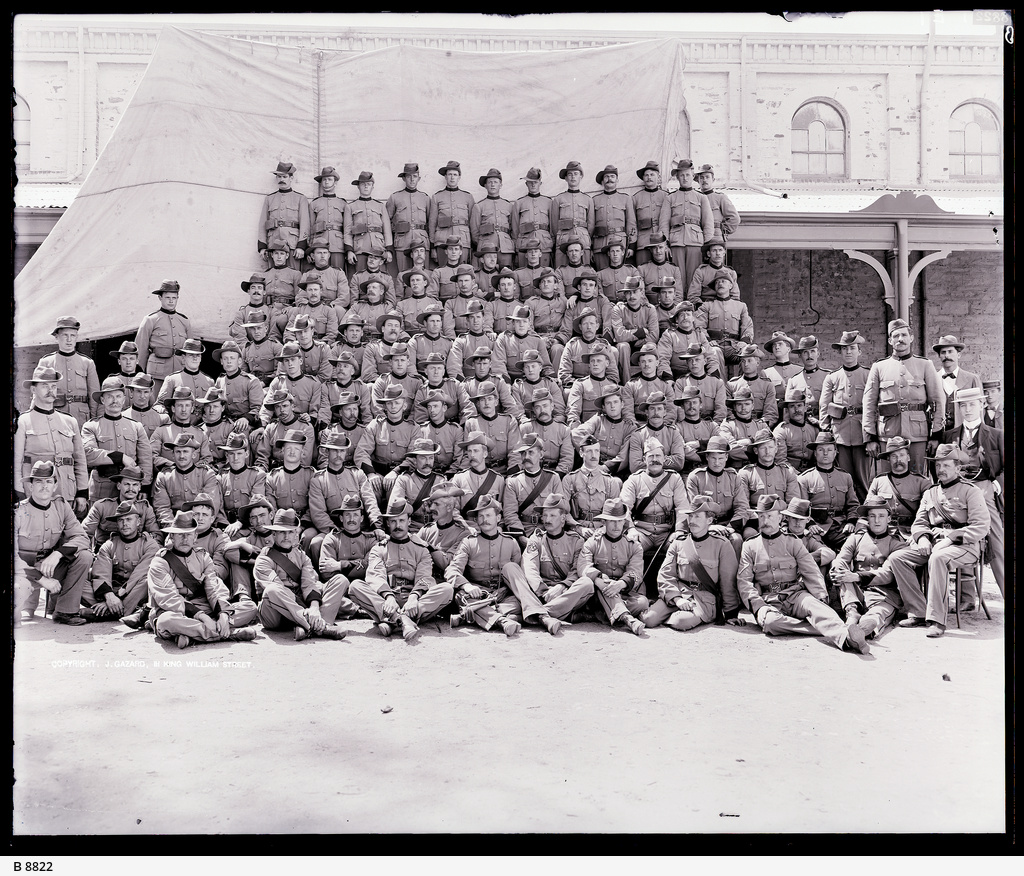
Group portrait of the 1st contingent, taken before departure from Adelaide

The 1st South Australian Mounted Rifles (SAMR) were raised as the South Australian Infantry Company in late 1899, under the command of Captain Frederick Henry Howland. The company was mostly composed of men with prior military experience, and numbered six officers and 121 men; It had a separate identity to the militia unit of the same name, though some on the members having previously served in that unit. It embarked at Port Adelaide aboard the troopship Medic on 2 November, disembarking at Cape Town on 25 November, where they camped at Maitland until 1 December. On that day, the company moved to De Aar by train, after which they marched to Belmont, joining the Australian Regiment there. With the regiment, it marched to Enslin on 10 December to relieve the Gordon Highlanders under the orders of Lieutenant-General Lord Methuen, after which it was held in reserve at the Battle of Magersfontein, in which it did not participate. During these operations, the company helped to guard the railway line from De Aar to the Modder River.

The company returned to Naauwpoort around the end of January, then to Rensburg and lastly Maeder's Farm, where it received horses and became a mounted rifle squadron, along with the other companies of the Australian Regiment; the South Australians were now designated the South Australian Mounted Rifles. With the regiment, the 1st SAMR became part of the British force commanded by Major-General Ralph Arthur Penrhyn Clements, holding positions in front of Colesberg. It lost an officer killed at Pink Hill on 12 February, when Clements' force was attacked by a superior Boer force. Following the engagement the British retreated towards Rensburg and to Arundel on the night of 13–14 February, where the regiment suffered multiple casualties while serving as the rearguard of the column. After reaching Arundel, Acting Adjutant Captain G.R. Lascelles of the Royal Fusiliers went back to the battlefield with a mainly 1st SAMR mixed volunteer group to "help infantrymen who had been left behind."

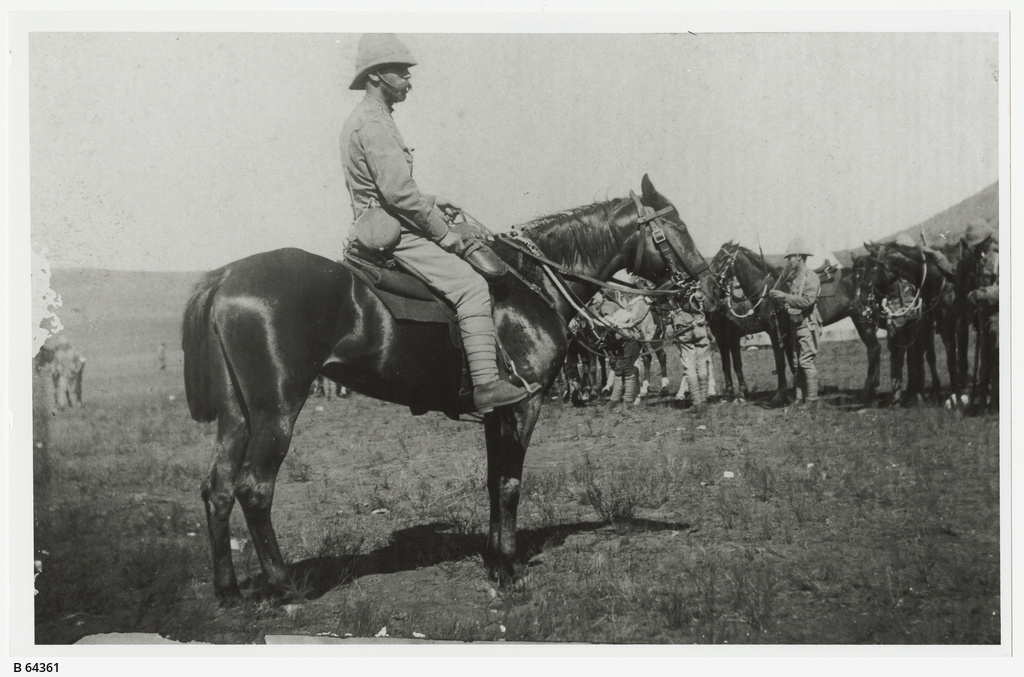
Howland giving the 'Prepare to mount' order to soldiers leaving camp at Rensburg, February 1900

The 1st SAMR joined the 2nd Battalion of the Berkshire Regiment after the retreat to Arundel, and participated in the repulse of a Boer attack on 20 February, followed by sustained engagements through the next eight days, during which it lost a trooper killed on 21 February. During the advance of Clements' Column from Arundel beginning on 28 February, the squadron was again in the rearguard. It was sent to the front on 8 March when preparations for crossing the Orange River at Norval’s Pont began, and engaged Boer troops until the column crossed on 15 March. The squadron participated in the subsequent march to Bloemfontein as part of the column of the Inniskilling Dragoons under Major Dauncey, on the right of Clements' force. The first and second contingents united at Bloemfontein to form the SAMR.

=== 2nd contingent and unified SAMR ===
The 2nd SAMR was raised as a mounted infantry squadron from the same types of men as the 1st contingent. It numbered seven officers and 112 men, under the command of Captain Charles James Reade. Among its men was Lance Corporal Harry Morant, executed for killing civilians during his subsequent service with the Bushveldt Carbineers. It left Adelaide aboard the troopship Surrey on 26 January 1900, disembarking at Cape Town on 25 February. The squadron encamped at Maitland before departing for De Aar by train on 2 March, arriving at the latter four days later. It marched to Britstown and joined the column of Colonel John Adye after arriving at De Aar, participating in the relief of Prieska during a Boer uprising in that area. According to one trooper, they returned 'with "whips" of loot'. After returning to De Aar, it moved to Norval's Pont by train, then marched to Bloemfontein under Major Euthoven of J Battery Royal Horse Artillery. During its independent operations the squadron was under the overall command of Generals William Forbes Gatacre and Reginald Pole-Carew.

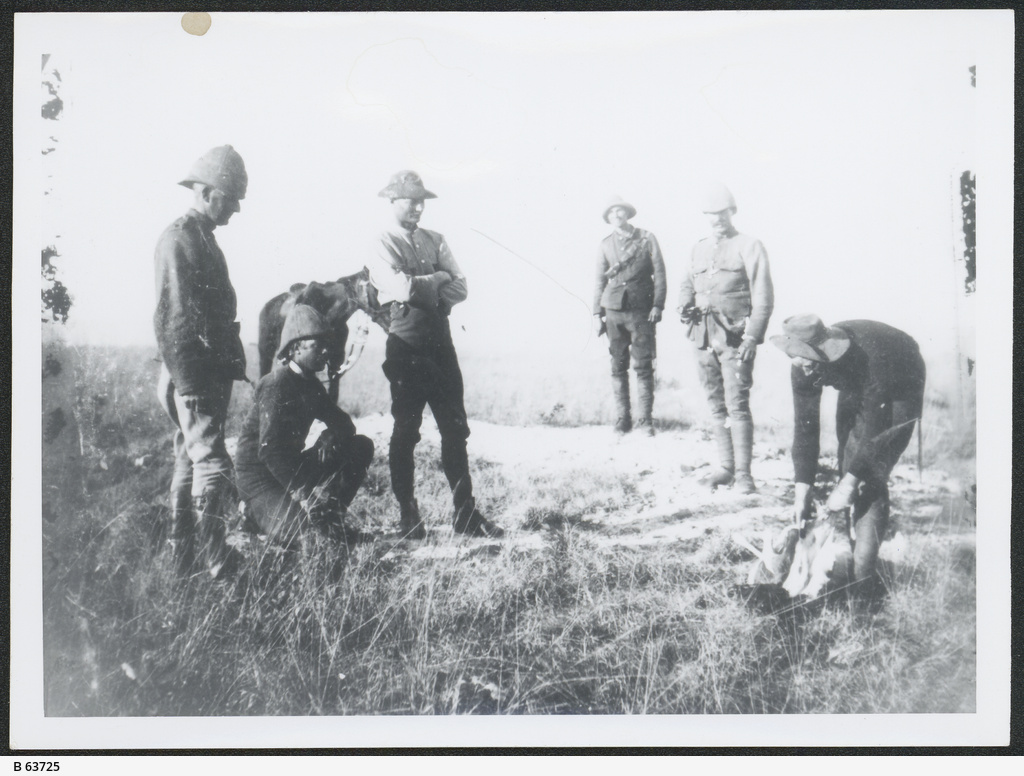
Soldiers of the 2nd SAMR watching a sheep being cut up for army rations

At Bloemfontein, the unified South Australian Mounted Rifles joined the Fourth Corps of the 1st Mounted Infantry Brigade, along with the Victorian Mounted Rifles, Tasmanian Mounted Infantry, 4th Battalion Imperial Mounted Infantry, J Battery Royal Horse Artillery, and two QF 1-pounder pom-pom guns, providing reconnaissance for the army of Field Marshal Frederick Roberts. The SAMR fought in the Karee-Brandfort action, under the command of General Charles Tucker, losing at least one wounded and one captured. It served as the advance guard of Pole-Carew's 11th Division in the march to Johannesburg, capturing seven engines while cutting the Pretoria railway under fire at Elandsfontein on 29 May.

On the morning of 30 May fifty men of the SAMR under Lieutenant Frank Milton Rowell and fifty Imperial Mounted Infantry under a captain were tasked with capturing the Doornfontein kopjes reservoir to the north of Johannesburg, leaving camp at 08:00. They fought their way into the city, unaware of the location of the reservoir, thus becoming the first to enter it. The SAMR were guided to the reservoir by remaining British residents and held it for the rest of the day, capturing ten prisoners. Returning to camp at 16:00 they retreated under fire, having lost two horses and expended most of their ammunition. Johannesburg was surrendered on the next day, and the SAMR entered the city behind corps commander Colonel St. George C. Henry and his staff. Lieutenants George Lynch and Rowell were handed the keys to the fort, over which the Union Jack was raised; 85 Boers surrendered to them that day. After participating in the capture of Pretoria and the Battle of Diamond Hill, it camped at Donkerhoek and Rhenoster Fontein between 13 June and 28 July. They marched through Bronkhorstspruit to Middelburg and fought in the Battle of Belfast on 7 September, the last pitched battle of the war, in which they suffered multiple casualties.

After Belfast, the SAMR marched along the Pretoria–Delagoa Bay Line to Komatipoort on the border with Portuguese East Africa via Helvetia, Machadodorp, Nooitgedacht, Kaapsehoop, Barberton, and Hectorspruit. The unit found abandoned Boer guns near Komatipoort, where they participated in a review in honour of the birthday of Carlos I, King of Portugal at Komatipoort, then returned by train to Pretoria on 9 October, where it camped at Sunnyside. The first contingent and 25 men of the second contingent departed from Cape Town aboard the troopship SS Harlech Castle on 3 November, arriving at Adelaide on 30 November. There, these soldiers were given a bonus of 30 days' pay by the South Australian Government and were disbanded. The remainder of the second contingent was attached to Brigadier-General Edwin Alderson's Mounted Infantry Brigade, serving in east and northeast Transvaal until March 1901. On 29 March the remaining men departed Cape Town aboard the transport Tongariro, arriving at Sydney on 1 May. Moving overland to Melbourne, the remaining portion of the 2nd SAMR participated in the Commonwealth inaugural celebrations before reaching Adelaide on 12 May, where it was given a bonus of 30 days' pay by the South Australian government, being disbanded three days later.

== Casualties, decorations, and battle honours ==
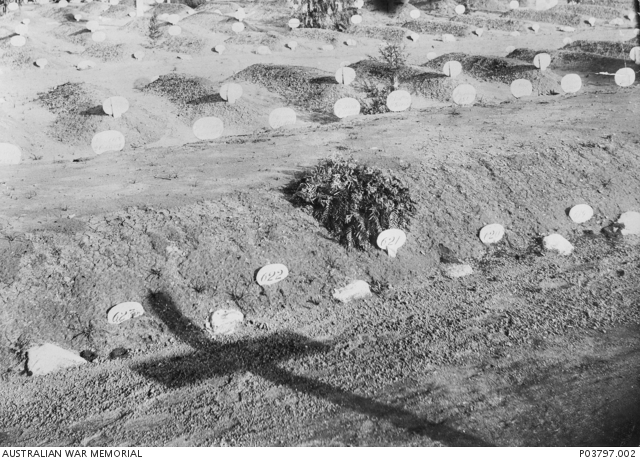
Grave of a 2nd SAMR trooper who died of disease, marked with wreath

The first contingent suffered casualties of two killed or died of wounds, one captured, and three died of disease, while the only casualties of the second contingent were four died of disease. Captain John Henry Stapleton of the first contingent received the Distinguished Service Order, along with Captain Joseph Francis Humphris of the second contingent. Four men of the second contingent received the Distinguished Conduct Medal. In addition, Reade was appointed a Companion of the Order of the Bath.

In 1903, the militia unit known as the South Australian Mounted Rifles was expanded into the 16th and 17th Australian Light Horse Regiments. Both regiments received an honorary banner for South African service in 1904 and the honorary distinction South Africa 1899–1902 for the service of the SAMR and SA Bushman's in the Boer War in 1908; both were awarded to units who had more than twenty members serve in the war. The battle honour South Africa 1899–1902 is carried by the 3rd/9th Light Horse (South Australian Mounted Rifles), which perpetuates the unit.
