= John Hoad =

Australian general

Sir John Hoad
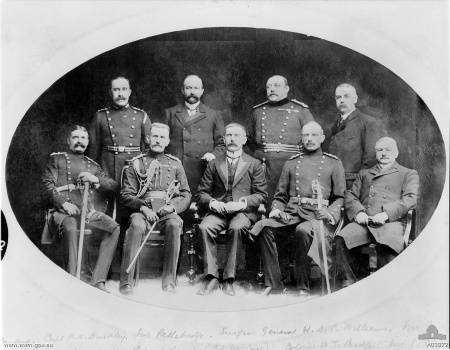
- Commonwealth Headquarters Staff, 1904. Hoad is second from left in front row
- Born: 25 January 1856; Goulburn, New South Wales
- Died: 6 October 1911 (aged 55); Melbourne, Victoria
- Military career
- Allegiance: Australia
- Branch: Victorian Military Forces; Australian Army
- Service years: 1884–1911
- Rank: Major General
- Commands: Chief of the General Staff; 1st Australian Regiment
- Conflicts: Second Boer War; Russo-Japanese War
- Awards: Knight Commander of the Order of St Michael and St George; Mentioned in Despatches; Order of the Rising Sun (Japan); Military Medal of Honour (Japan)

Major General Sir John Charles Hoad KCMG (25 January 1856 – 6 October 1911) was an Australian military leader, best known as the Australian Army's second Chief of the General Staff.

== Family ==
John Hoad's parents were George Hoad, born in Winchelsea, Sussex, and Catherine Kearney, born County Tipperary. They married in March 1851 at Goulburn, New South Wales. They had four sons and one daughter.

Hoad was a talented athlete, excellent horseman, Australian rules footballer and cricketer. He married Sarah Denniston Sennetts, (née Brown), in Wangaratta on 22 December 1881. They had a daughter, who died as a child, and two sons. The younger son, Oswald Vick Hoad (30 July 1888 – 12 September 1963), enlisted in the Victorian militia in 1907 and transferred to permanent military forces in 1910; as Major Hoad served as Base Commandant in South Australia, retired from the Australian Army in 1946.

== Career ==
On 1 January 1878, John Hoad entered the Victorian Education Department as a teacher at Gooramadda State School and by September he was an assistant at Wangaratta School. In April 1881 he became head teacher at Wangaratta North.

Hoad began his military career in 1884, when he joined the Victorian Rifles as a militia lieutenant. He soon resigned his position as a teacher to join the permanent military staff.

On 4 June 1886, Hoad was appointed as adjutant of the Victorian Mounted Rifles, and through his aptitude, was quickly promoted to captain, and then major, within two years. In October 1889 he left Victoria for England where he studied signalling, military engineering and musketry for two years before returning to Victoria to be appointed as the second in command of the Victorian Mounted Rifles.

Hoad was an astute and capable commander, and by 1895 he had been promoted to lieutenant colonel, as well as becoming the first Australian-born assistant Adjutant General at Victorian Military Headquarters.

Hoad was again sent to England in 1897, and was appointed to the personal staff of Lord Roberts and the Duke of Connaught for Queen Victoria's Diamond Jubilee. Immediately after, he returned to Melbourne, and by 1899 had attained the rank of colonel.

Hoad saw service in the Second Boer War as a special service officer, and upon arriving in Cape Town on 28 April 1899, was given overall command of the 1st Australian Regiment, which contained colonial troops from Tasmania, South Australia, Victoria and Western Australia.

The force moved to Orange River, where they met up with the Kimberley Relief Force. In Bloemfontein in April 1900, the 1st Australian Regiment was merged with the 1st Mounted Infantry Brigade under Edward Hutton, and Hoad was appointed as assistant adjutant general. However, by July 1900, he had been invalided and evacuated back to Australia. For his services in the Boer War, Hoad was appointed a Companion of the Order of St Michael and St George, awarded the Queen's South Africa Medal, and mentioned in despatches.

Between 1902 and 1906 Hoad served as aide-de-camp to the Governor-General of Australia. From November 1903 to January 1904 he was temporarily commander of the 6th Military District (Tasmania).

Hoad was sent by Chief of the General Staff, Edward Hutton, to Manchuria on attachment to the Imperial Japanese Army. Along with other Western military attachés, Hoad had two complementary missions: to assist the Japanese, and; to observe the Japanese forces in the field during the Russo-Japanese War. For this service, he received the Japanese Order of the Rising Sun, Gold Rays with Neck Ribbon, which represents the third highest of eight classes associated with this award. His participation in the war was also recognised with a presentation of the Japanese War Medal.

Upon returning to Australia in January 1905, Hoad was appointed to the newly formed Military Board with the title of Deputy Adjutant General. In September 1906 he was promoted to brigadier general, and again promoted to major general in January 1907. At this time he was serving the Military Board as Inspector General. In 1908 Hoad again visited London, this time to discuss plans for the establishment of an Imperial General Staff at the War Office. He also participated in the British Army's autumn manoeuvres.

Hoad's recommendations about the Imperial General Staff were accepted, and on 1 July 1909, then Secretary for Defence, Sir George Pearce, appointed him as Chief of the General Staff. He met Lord Kitchener in Darwin on 21 December 1909 to discuss Australia's land defences, and joined him for a two-month-long tour of inspection of the whole country. By 1911 he had begun planning for the introduction of Australian universal military training, but with failing health, took sick leave on 1 June 1911.

Hoad was appointed a Knight Commander of the Order of St Michael and St George (KCMG) upon the occasion of the coronation of King George V on 22 June 1911. Sir John died of a heart disorder in Melbourne on 6 October 1911.

== See also ==
- Military attachés and observers in the Russo-Japanese War

Military offices
Preceded by Colonel William Bridges	Chief of the General Staff; 1909–1911	Succeeded by Lieutenant Colonel Francis Wilson
