= South Australian Citizen Bushmen =

- Active: 1900–1901
- Country: South Australia
- Allegiance: British Empire
- Type: Mounted infantry
- Size: Initial: 6 officers and 93 men
- Engagements: Second Boer War

The South Australian Bushmen (known as the South Australian Citizen Bushmen to distinguish them from the later South Australian Imperial Bushmen) was a mounted infantry squadron of the Colony of South Australia that served in the Second Boer War, the third contingent contributed by the colony.

Raised in early 1900, the squadron was initially sent to Rhodesia, then entered the western Transvaal in June, where it operated until its return to Australia in April 1901.

== History ==
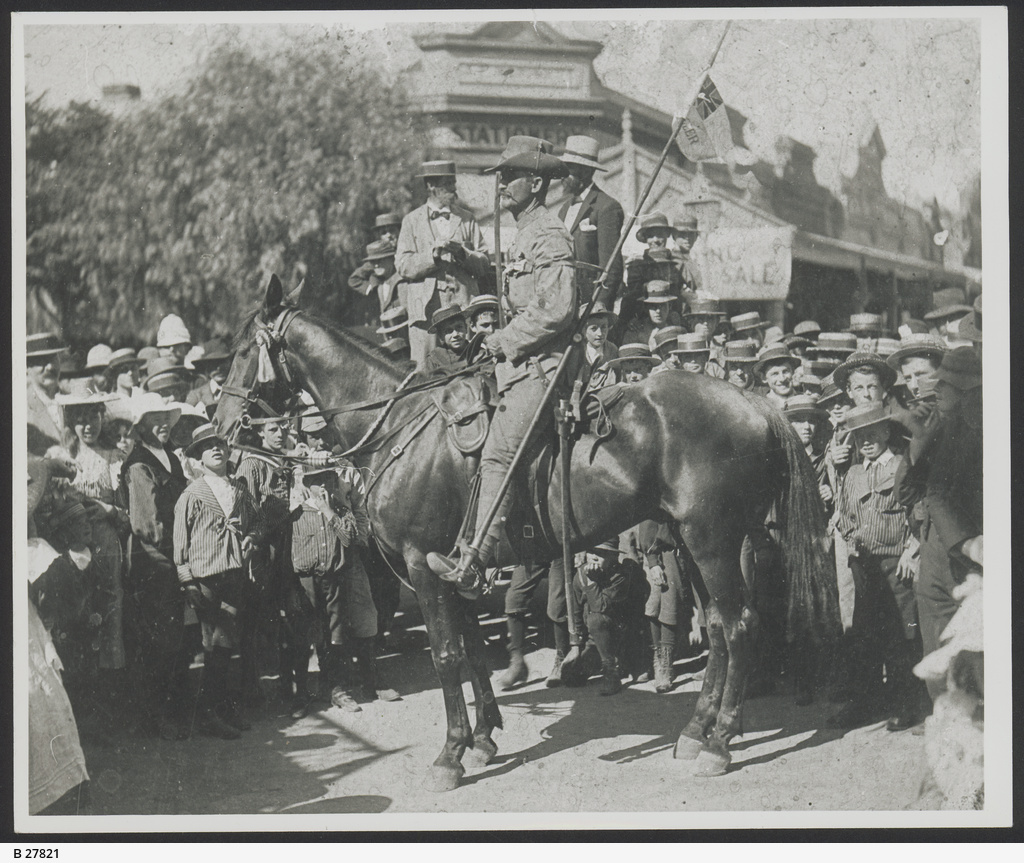
Fund raising for the contingent

The South Australian Citizen Bushmen, the third contingent contributed by the colony, were funded by private subscriptions, which were administered by a Bushman's Committee; enough money was raised to fund it up to June 1901. Its men were required to be skilled at horsemanship, riflery and bushcraft in the belief that they could counter the Boer methods of warfare. Under the command of 52-year old German Australian Captain Samuel G. Hübbe, the six officers and 99 men of the unit, chosen from 1,200 applicants, departed for South Africa aboard the troopship SS Maplemore with 100 horses on 7 March 1900. The transport stopped at Fremantle to embark the Western Australian Citizen Bushmen, and crossed the Indian Ocean to arrive at Beira, where the Bushmen disembarked on 1 April.

For the next several weeks the Bushmen served in Rhodesia as part of the Rhodesian Field Force led by Frederick Carrington. It was planned to be included in the 2nd Regiment of the Rhodesian Field Force along with the Tasmanian and Queensland Citizen Bushmen, but the former was broken up and never served together before the force advanced into western Transvaal from the Mafeking area on 24 June, joining the division of Lord Methuen. The squadron patrolled the Marico and moved towards Elands River between 4 July and 9 August, when they retreated to Mafeking with Carrington. After participating in a skirmish on 13 August, it fought at Buffelshoek and took casualties on the next day. They became part of the Composite Bushmen Regiment with other Bushmen's contingents on 15 August. During the regiment's second fight at Ottoshoop on 12 September, Hübbe was killed while "checking his squadron to make sure no one was missing"; he was subsequently replaced as Captain by Lieutenant Angus Edward Collins.

The squadron suffered casualties during an engagement at Lichtenburg on 26 September. From late 1900 to early 1901 the squadron served with the regiment in multiple engagements in western Transvaal and north of the Orange Free State. On 3 February it lost one man killed and an officer and five men wounded at Uitralskop. Collins and another man were wounded at a fierce action near Rietfontein on 16 February. The contingent lost only three killed or died of wounds, including Hübbe. Collins and Lieutenant Charles Marsh Ives were awarded the Distinguished Service Order for their actions. The Citizen Bushmen departed Cape Town aboard the SS Morayshire on 29 April, arriving at Adelaide about 25 June. As a result of having served longer than expected, senior officers present on the return voyage reported that the Bushmen contingents aboard the Morayshire were "very much out of hand the whole of the time". After the contingent departed, Methuen praised them in a letter to the secretary of the South Australian Bushmen's Committee, stating "I cannot conceive any body of men of whom a commander has greater reason to be proud."

In 1903, the militia unit known as the South Australian Mounted Rifles was expanded into the 16th and 17th Australian Light Horse Regiments. Both regiments received an honorary banner for South African service in 1904 and the honorary distinction South Africa 1899–1902 for the service of the SAMR and SA Bushman's in the Boer War in 1908; both were awarded to units who had more than twenty members serve in the war. The battle honour South Africa 1899–1902 is carried by the 3rd/9th Light Horse (South Australian Mounted Rifles), which perpetuates the unit.
