= John James Clements =

Recipient of the Victoria Cross

John James Clements VC
- Born: 19 June 1872; Middelburg, Cape Colony (now Eastern Cape, South Africa)
- Died: 18 June 1937 (aged 65); Newcastle, Natal, Union of South Africa
- Burial place: Town Cemetery, Newcastle
- Military career
- Allegiance: United Kingdom; Union of South Africa
- Rank: Sergeant
- Units: Rimington's Guides
- Conflicts: Second Boer War; World War I
- Awards: Victoria Cross

John James Clements, VC (19 June 1872 – 18 June 1937) was a South African recipient of the Victoria Cross, the highest and most prestigious award for gallantry in the face of the enemy that can be awarded to British and Commonwealth forces.

Clements was 28 years old, and a corporal in Rimington's Guides, South African Forces during the Second Boer War when the following deed took place for which he was awarded the VC:

On the 24th February, 1900, near Strijdenburg, when dangerously wounded through the lungs and called upon to surrender, Corporal Clements, threw himself into the midst of a party of five Boers, shooting three of them with his revolver, and thereby causing the whole party to surrender to himself and two unwounded men of Rimington's Guides.

Following the end of the war, he went to the United Kingdom and received the decoration from the Prince of Wales during a large coronation parade of colonial troops in London on 1 July 1902.

Clements later achieved the rank of Sergeant serving in World War I.
