= Tank rampage =

Tank rampage may refer to:

- 1993 Perth tank rampage, an event in the early hours of 27 April 1993
- 1995 San Diego tank rampage, the theft of an M60A3 tank and the destruction therewith
