= Mannheim attack =

Mannheim attack may refer to several attacks concerning the city of Mannheim, Germany:

- Bombing of Mannheim in World War II, a sustained Allied bombing campaign
- 1982 Mannheim tank attack
- 2024 Mannheim stabbing, mass stabbing on an anti-Islam rally
- 2025 Mannheim car attack, a vehicle ramming attack
