= 1982 Mannheim attack =

1982 road attack in Germany

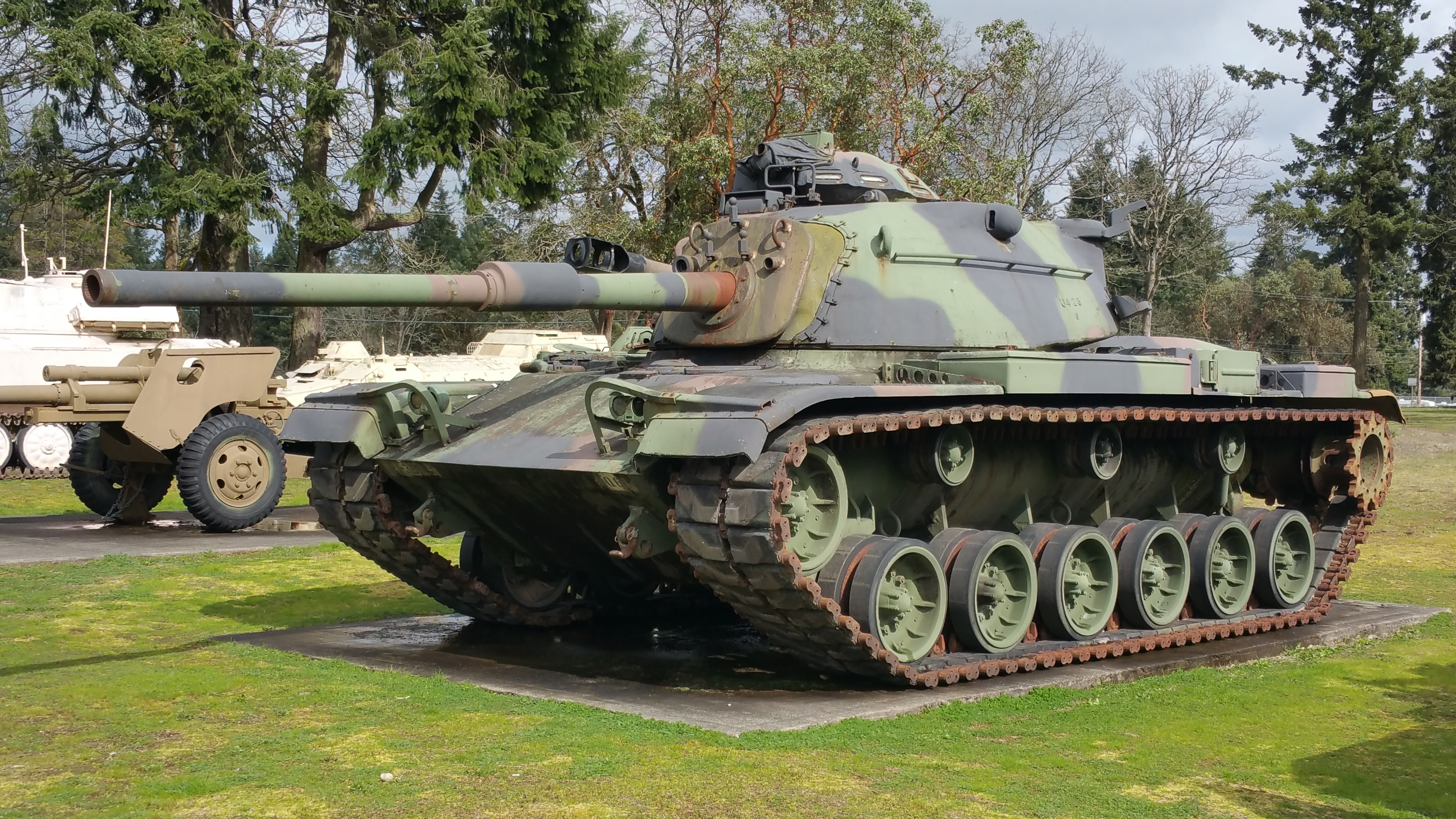
- A decommissioned M60 tank, similar to the one used in the attack
- Location: Mannheim, Baden-Württemberg, West Germany
- Date: 10 July 1982
- Weapon: M60 tank
- Deaths: 1 (the perpetrator)
- Injuries: 4
- Perpetrator: Charles S. Keefer
- Charges: 2,000,000 Deutsche Mark

On 10 July 1982, a 20-year-old United States Army soldier drove a stolen U.S. Army M60 tank through downtown Mannheim, Baden-Württemberg, West Germany. Four people were injured, and the soldier, whose motive remains unknown, died by drowning in a nearby river. The property damage amounted to around 2 million West German Deutsche Mark (DM).

== Course of events ==
Charles S. Keefer, a mentally ill 20-year-old U.S. soldier from Berwick, Pennsylvania, stole an M60 tank parked in the Sullivan Barracks in Mannheim at around 2 p.m. on 10 July 1982, and drove it uncontrollably into the Mannheim city center for about 45 minutes. Four people were injured, and eleven cars, a streetcar and a number of electricity pylons and traffic lights were destroyed. The property damage amounted to around 2 million West German Deutsche Mark (DM).

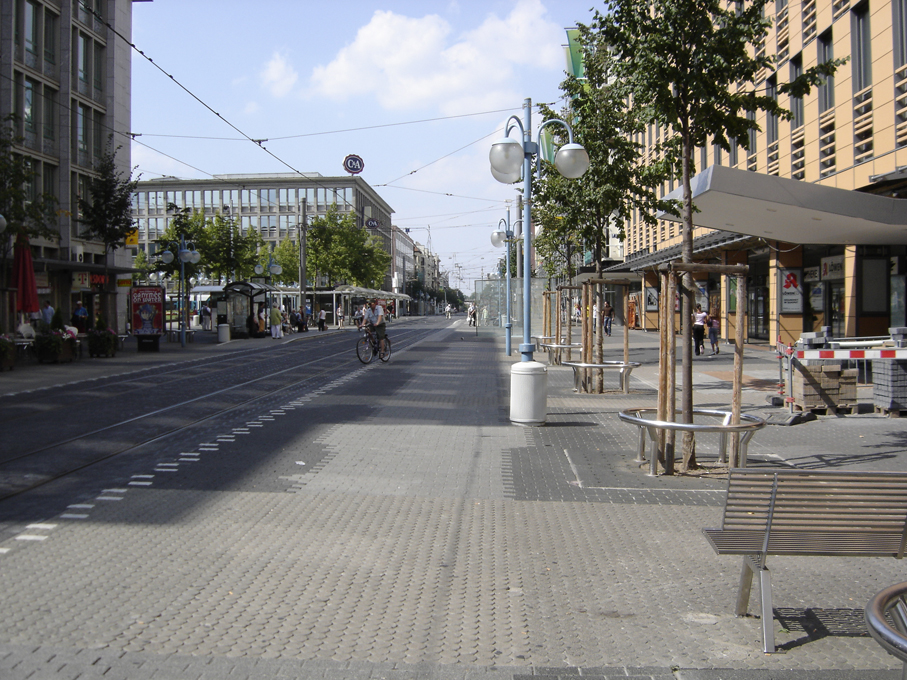
Part of the Planken, a shopping street in Mannheim, pictured in 2005

At the height of the Mannheim Wasserturm, he drove a loop through the Planken to the crossroads between squares M5 and M6 and then back towards Kaiserring. During his journey, he ran over numerous cars and damaged lamp posts, traffic lights, overhead line poles, and buildings. It also collided with the rear section of a streetcar whose passengers had been asked to leave the rear section shortly beforehand. During the rampage, the tank was pursued by both West German police and the US military police. A pursuing US soldier climbed onto the moving tank near the Tattersall and tried to reach the lever for the fire extinguishing system through the open flap of the driver's compartment. If it had been triggered, the tank would have stopped. However, the soldier lost his footing and fell directly in front of the tank, which drove over him. Due to the tank's ground clearance, he was only slightly injured.

On the Kurpfalzbrücke bridge, the driver stopped the tank, climbed into the gun turret and began to swing the cannon in different directions. He then reversed the tank at full throttle, breaking through a bridge railing and plunging into the Neckar River twelve meters below at approximately 3:30 p.m.

Divers found no signs of life in the driver and an initial recovery attempt with three M80 recovery vehicles failed. On 11 July 1982, the Achilles floating crane lifted the tank out of the river. The autopsy of the soldier's body revealed no alcohol or drug influence.

== See also ==
- 2025 Mannheim car attack
- 1998 Alma rampage
- 1995 San Diego tank rampage
- 1993 Perth tank rampage
- Marvin Heemeyer
