= M113 armoured personnel carriers in Australian service =

Australian Army armoured fighting vehicle

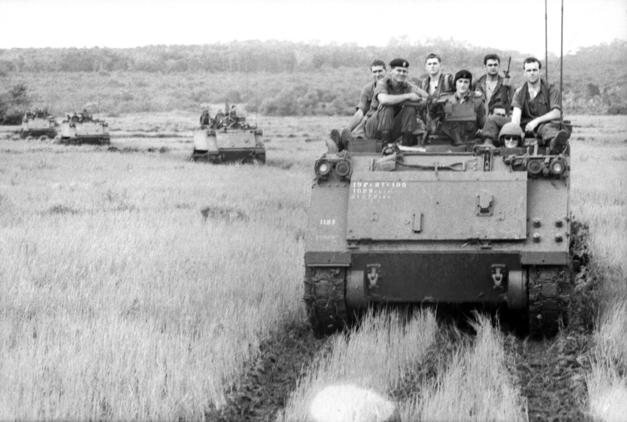
M113s from the 1st Armoured Personnel Carrier Squadron carrying soldiers of the 6th Battalion, Royal Australian Regiment in South Vietnam during 1966

The M113 armoured personnel carriers are American produced military vehicles that have operated in the Australian Army since 1964. An initial pair of M113s was purchased for trials purposes in 1962. Either 817 or 840 were acquired by 1979, comprising nine different variants. A long-running modernisation program that commenced in the 1990s resulted in 431 M113s being upgraded between 2007 and 2012. All of the upgraded M113s remain in service as of 2020.

In Australian service, the M113 has equipped armoured transport and reconnaissance units as well as mechanised infantry formations. It has also been used as a support vehicle by many other units. The type played an important role in Australia's commitment to the Vietnam War between 1965 and 1972. Some M113s were deployed as part of peacekeeping missions in Somalia during 1993 and Rwanda between 1994 and 1995. Larger numbers of M113s operated in East Timor from 1999 to 2002 and 2006 to 2008.

Despite the upgrade program, the Australian Army's M113s are now obsolete and they have not been included in recent deployments due to their vulnerability to attack. A project to replace the M113s with infantry fighting vehicles is underway, with a decision on the type to be procured scheduled for 2023. It is planned that the replacement vehicles will begin to enter service from 2025 and the M113s will be retired when this process is complete.

== Acquisition ==
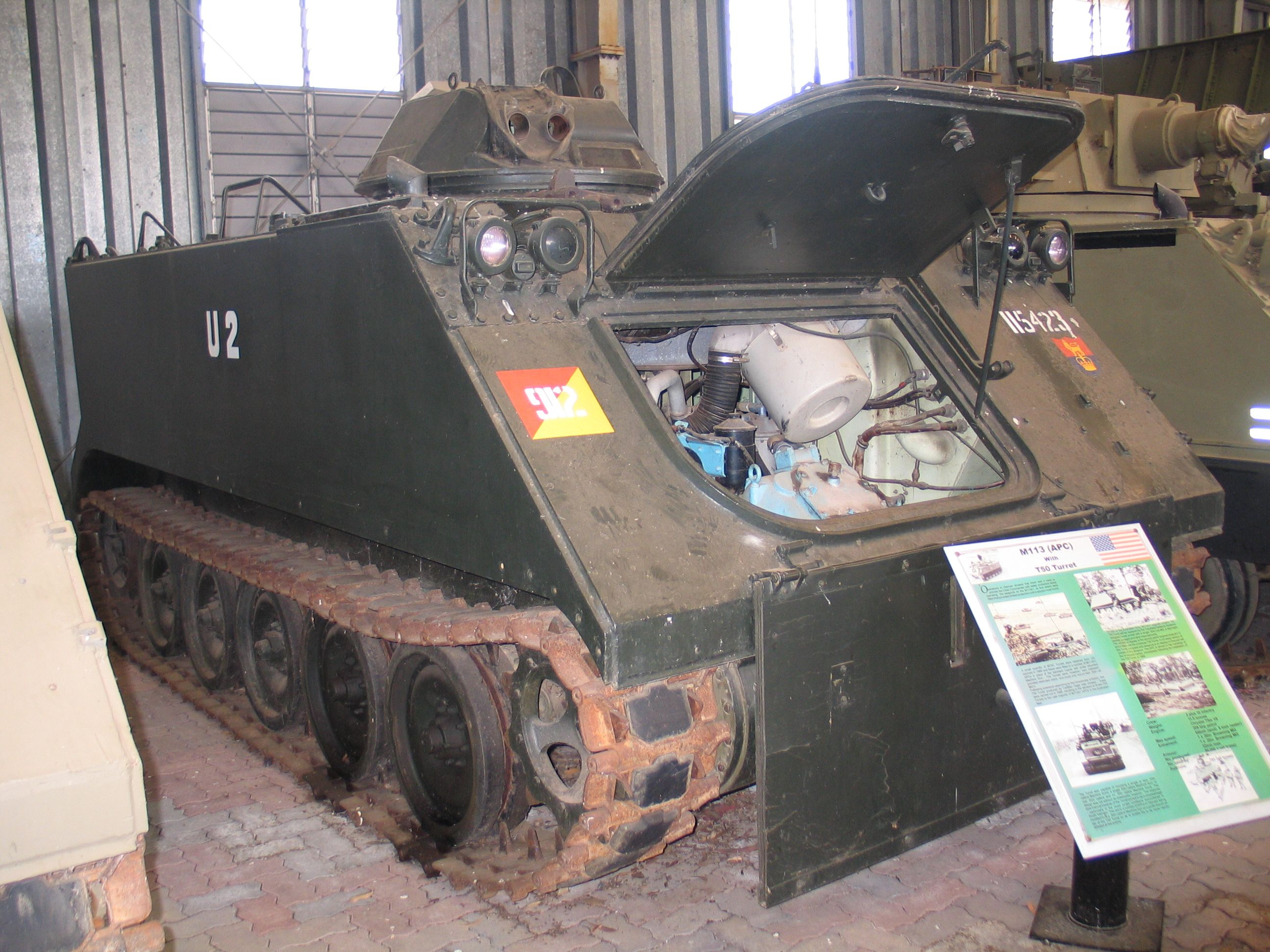
One of the two M113s which was purchased for the trials program during 1962 and 1963; the vehicle was later fitted with a T50 turret

=== Trials ===
In 1958, the Chief of the Australian Army's General Staff, Lieutenant-General Ragnar Garrett, initiated a program to modernise the Army's organisation and equipment so that it was compatible with those of Australia's allies, particularly the United States Army. This program included the acquisition of armoured personnel carriers (APCs), as well as FN FAL rifles, M60 machine guns, M2A2 howitzers, M40 recoilless rifles, L16 81mm mortars and radios.

The adoption of the pentropic organisation in 1960 led to a requirement for APCs to equip the Army's armoured units within the Royal Australian Armoured Corps (RAAC). This organisation included two APC regiments, the 12th/16th Hunter River Lancers and the 8th/13th Victorian Mounted Rifles; both were reserve Citizen Military Forces (CMF) units. Each regiment was authorised 119 APCs. A further two APCs were planned to be issued to each of the Army's two armoured regiments and nine were to form part of the equipment of the two divisional reconnaissance squadrons. The reconnaissance regiment in the pentropic divisions' combat support group was to have 25 APCs. The pentropic structure was abandoned in 1965, before M113s had been delivered in significant numbers.

A formal Weapons and Equipment Policy Statement specifying the Army's requirements for tracked APCs was issued on 26 June 1960. This document was very similar to a British War Office Policy Statement issued in the late 1950s. It called for the Army to acquire tracked APCs that were amphibious and could be carried by aircraft. These vehicles were to replace the Army's wheeled scout cars and APCs which had been purchased in the 1950s, as well as obsolete armoured fighting vehicles (AFVs) dating from the Second World War. It was believed that the wheeled armoured vehicles were no longer suitable, as the Australian Army expected that it would need to fight in tropical conditions in South East Asia. Tracked vehicles were preferred for these conditions as they had superior off-road performance, including in jungle terrain. The statement specified that the new vehicles would be used to equip the Army's APC, armoured and reconnaissance units. At this time the Army did not include any mechanised infantry units which were permanently issued APCs, and separate APC-equipped units were used to provide protected transport for light infantry.

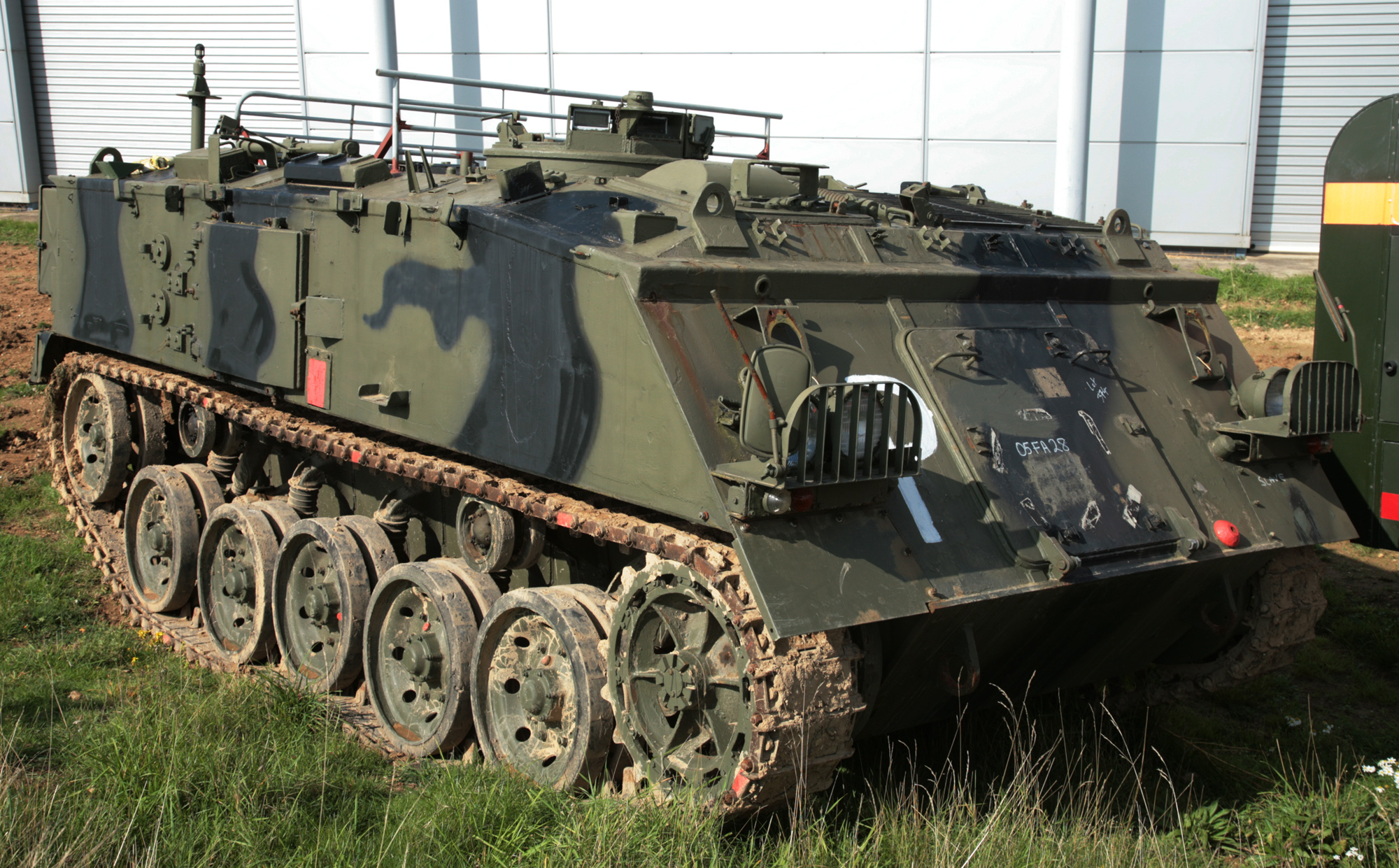
A retired British FV432 photographed in 2006

The Weapons and Equipment Policy Statement included a requirement that potentially suitable designs be subjected to extensive trials in tropical conditions before an order was placed. The American M113, the British FV432 and the Canadian Bobcat were considered. The Bobcat was the least advanced and no prototype had been completed, so it was rejected before trials were conducted. After negotiations between the Australian and British governments between 1960 and 1962, the British Ministry of Defence (MOD) requested that Australia conduct a trial of the FV432 in tropical conditions. The Australian Army rapidly agreed to this request, and two FV432s were shipped to Australia, arriving in September 1962. These were prototypes, as the FV432 was yet to enter production. It proved simpler to acquire M113s for trial as the type had been in mass production since 1960. Two were ordered in 1961, and they arrived in Australia on 9 October 1962.

From November 1962 to April 1963, the two FV432s and two M113s were subjected to trials at several locations with different climatic conditions in the state of Queensland. The trials began with crew familiarisation and driver training on both types in the Innisfail area. Once this was complete, the four vehicles were driven 1,100 kilometres (680 mi) to Mount Isa to conduct trials in hot and dry conditions. These included automotive and physiological tests, the latter of particular interest to the MOD. Testing in extreme heat during this phase found the M113's poor ventilation took a heavy toll on crew and passengers; one driver lost 5 kilograms (11 lb) in two hours. The FV432's forced air ventilation system proved superior. At the conclusion of this stage of the trials, the vehicles were driven a further 1,200 kilometres (750 mi) back to Innisfail for hot and wet trials at nearby Mourilyan. This phase included extensive driving through jungles and on sandy beaches, amphibious testing and being left unattended for 14 days. The M113 outperformed the FV432 in almost every aspect; its smooth sides and roof stowage proved far superior when driving through overgrown jungle, the lower track pressure and better track design proved superior on sand and it was significantly more waterproof. It was also found that the M113 required significantly less time to prepare for amphibious operations, though it was slightly slower than the FV432 in the water. The FV432's amphibious preparations included the removal of every inspection plate and the erection of a large rubber flotation screen; the latter was seen as a major drawback as it completely blocked the driver's vision and the rubber screen was easily punctured by debris or vegetation.

At the conclusion of the trials, the FV432s were shipped back to the United Kingdom. One was later used by the British Army for trials purposes during the development of the FV438 Swingfire. The M113s were retained by the Australian Army, which used them to trial several modifications to the type. Both were eventually transferred to the Royal Australian Armoured Corps Memorial and Army Tank Museum.

=== Purchase and deliveries ===
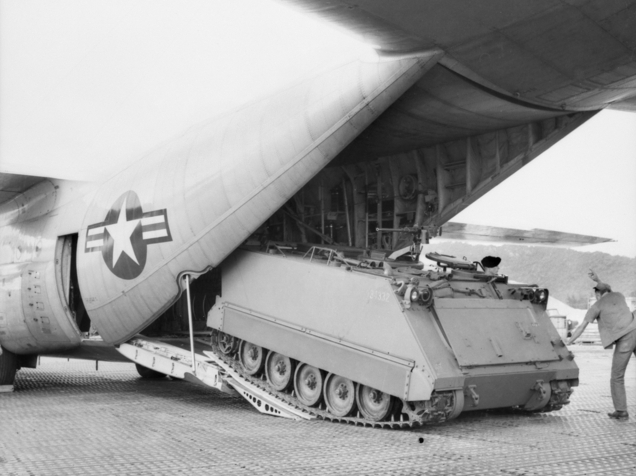
An Australian M113A1 being loaded onto a United States Air Force Lockheed C-130 Hercules in South Vietnam during 1965

The trials demonstrated that the M113 was much better suited to the Army's requirements than the FV432, and accordingly the M113 was selected. Several improvements to the type were recommended before final acceptance. These modifications included the installation of a ventilation system and, in coordination with engineers from the vehicle's manufacturer FMC, a ventilation system unique to Australian vehicles was developed. Orders were placed during the 1963–1964 financial year. At this time, it was planned to retain the M113 in service until 1995.

The M113A1 variant was ordered for the Army, the first deliveries being scheduled for 1964. This vehicle had a crew of two and could carry up to eleven passengers. Its armour provided protection against small arms and shrapnel. While the original US Army M113s were powered by a petrol engine, the Australian Army selected the M113A1 variant that used the General Motors 6V-53 Detroit Diesel engine. This is a V-6 displacing 5.2 liters (318 cubic inches), developing up to 300 bhp (220 kW) @2,800 rpm and 666 lb⋅ft (903 N⋅m) of torque @1,400 rpm. This was chosen because the variant had greater range and the diesel fuel it used was less likely to combust if the APC was damaged in combat. As the same engine was used to power buses in Australia, spare parts were also readily available. The Australian M113A1s were initially armed with a single pintle-mounted 0.5 inch calibre M2 Browning heavy machine gun.

In 1962 the Army decided that cavalry regiments equipped with lightly armoured vehicles would be its main armoured units. It was believed at the time that tanks were unsuited for the tropical environments the Army expected to fight in, and that lightly armoured vehicles would provide adequate support for the infantry. The structure of the cavalry regiments was established in 1964, the same year as the decision to abandon the Pentropic structure was made. They were to include three fighting squadrons, each with three troops equipped with APCs, a fire support troop and an anti-tank and surveillance troop. At the time the Army did not have any fire support vehicles; the M113A1 Fire Support Vehicle (FSV) later filled this role. In 1965 it was decided to structure the RAAC as armoured (tank), cavalry and APC regiments. The M113s were to be operated by RAAC personnel, and be treated as fighting vehicles rather than only armoured troop transports. The CMF armoured units were to be equipped with M113s for training purposes. In his history of the RAAC, Major General Ronald Hopkins judged that the cavalry regiment structure produced "handy" units with considerable mobility and firepower, but their effectiveness "rested on not being opposed by medium tanks or heavy anti-tank weapons".

Deliveries of the M113 began in 1964 but proved slow, the first bulk shipment of the type arriving in early 1965. The first vehicles to be delivered included specialist variants, including fitters vehicles (which carried maintenance personnel) and mortar carriers. M113s were initially issued to the Armoured Centre at Puckapunyal for crew training, which was conducted by US Army personnel at first. The type began to be issued to RAAC units on 19 March 1965. Priority was given to the Australian Regular Army's APC units, where the M113s initially replaced Alvis Saracen wheeled APCs. CMF units were accorded a low priority for M113s due to the need to allocate them to units involved in the Vietnam War, and some did not receive any until the late 1960s. Deliveries of the M113s were completed in 1979.

The planned cavalry and APC regiments were established in 1966. The 1st Cavalry Regiment was formed in January, and renamed the 2nd Cavalry Regiment later that year. The APC regiment was established as the 3rd Cavalry Regiment. The CMF 4th/19th Prince of Wales's Light Horse, 10th Light Horse Regiment, 2nd/14th Light Horse Regiment and 3rd/9th Light Horse (South Australian Mounted Rifles) were also converted to the cavalry regiment structure during 1966. The 4th Cavalry Regiment, a cavalry formation, was established in 1971.

== M113A1 variants and modifications ==
=== M113A1 variants ===
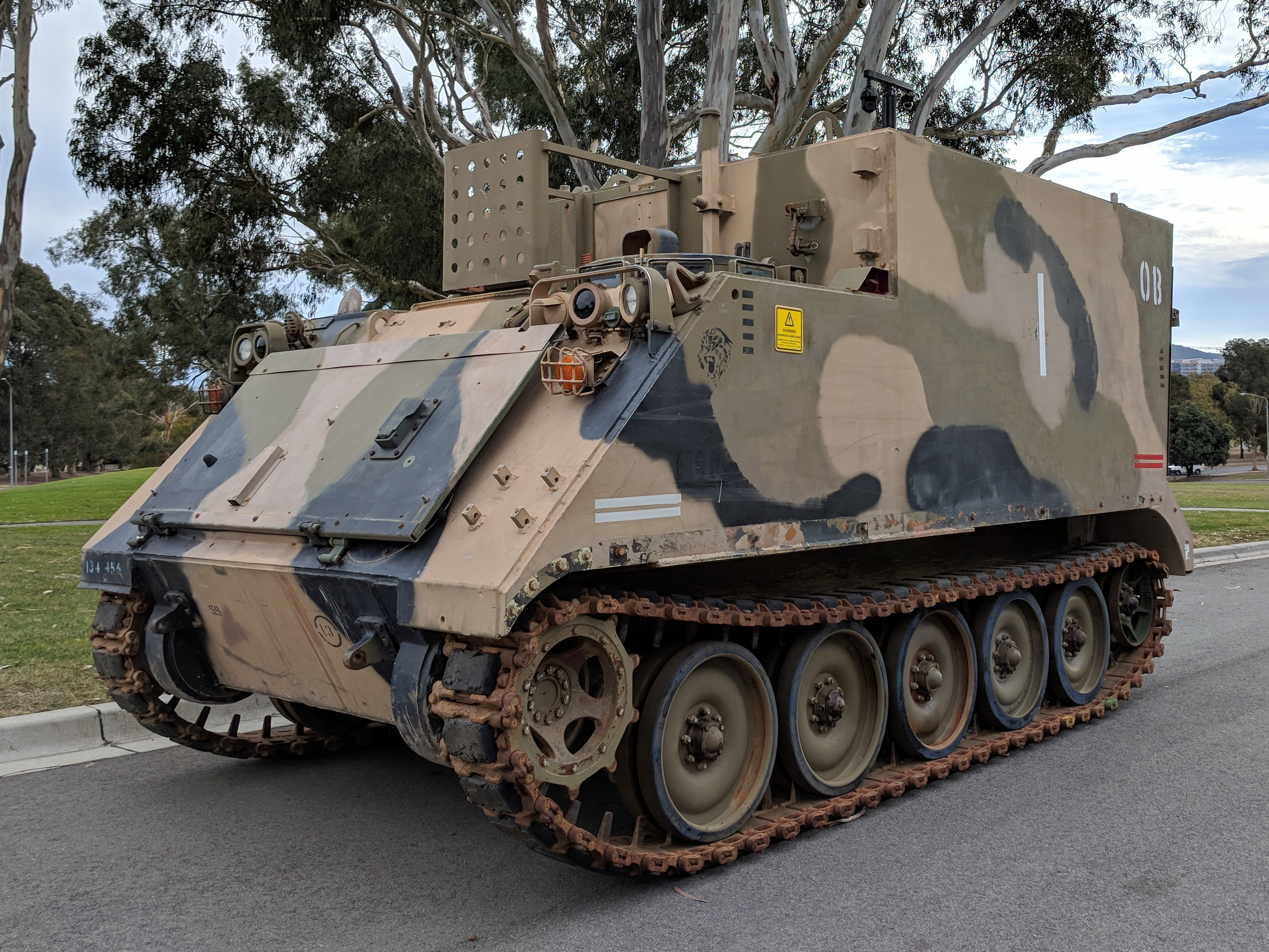
A former Australian Army M577A1 Armoured Command Vehicle

The original orders of M113s included several variants in addition to the M113A1 APC:

- M125A1: These vehicles were based on the M113A1 and fitted with a single 81 mm mortar. The mortar was mounted inside the rear hull on a turntable, and racking was fitted inside the vehicle to carry mortar ammunition. The variant had a large hatch on the roof of its hull which the mortar was fired through. The M125A1 was armed with a M2 Browning for self-protection.
- M113A1 Fitters: These vehicles were also based on the M113A1 and were used to repair equipment in combat areas. They were fitted with a hydraulic crane on their roof capable of lifting an engine and transmission pack. The vehicles also carried tools, spare parts and technicians. They were armed with a M2 Browning.
- M113 Armoured Recovery Vehicle Light (ARVL): This variant was used to recover other vehicles from the field.
- M577A1 Armoured Command Vehicle (ACV): This variant had a raised rear hull to accommodate working spaces for headquarters staff. The working space could be extended by erecting a canvas tent which was attached to the hull. The M577A1 was originally armed with a 0.3 inch M1919 Browning machine gun, though a M60 machine gun was sometimes fitted instead.
- M548 Tracked Load Carrier (TLC): The M548 was an unarmoured logistics variant of the M113. The type was acquired in the early 1970s to replace wheeled logistics carriers within armoured units.

=== Vietnam War-era modifications ===
In common with almost all the other countries that have operated M113s, a number of Australia-specific variants of the type were developed. Operational experience in South Vietnam rapidly demonstrated a need to provide armour protection for the M113's machine gun, as the crew commander who operated the machine gun was highly vulnerable when using the weapon. From August 1965, M113A1s began to be fitted with armoured shields that comprised a front plate and angled wings on each side. They were built by Army workshops in South Vietnam to varying designs, and were similar to shields fitted to the Army of the Republic of Vietnam's M113s. While the shields provided some protection, the gun position remained unprotected from the sides and rear.

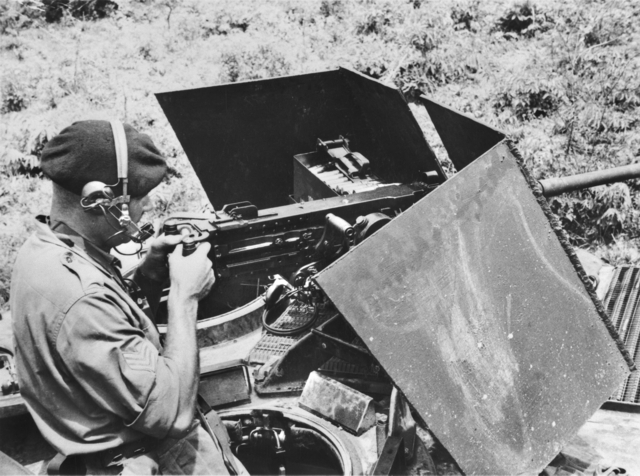
A member of the 4th/19th Prince of Wales's Light Horse firing a 0.5 calibre heavy machine gun from behind a gun shield fitted to a M113A1 APC in August 1965

As an interim measure to improve protection, 19 M113A1s in Vietnam and one in Australia were fitted with Model 74C turrets between September and November 1966. These provided all-round protection, and were armed with two M1919A4 Browning machine guns. The turret was very cramped, and its traverse mechanisms rapidly wore out. All of the Model 74C turrets were withdrawn by December 1968.

The T50 turret was selected as the standard turret for Australian M113s. The US Army had fitted one of these turrets to an M113 on an experimental basis in 1964. The Australian Army was aware of this experiment, and began its own trials of the turret in April 1966. The trials team delivered a favourable report, and the turret was approved for service in late 1966. M113A1s fitted with T50 turrets began to arrive in South Vietnam in August 1968. Almost all of the Australian Army's M113A1s were eventually fitted with these turrets. The turret was initially armed with two L3A3 machine guns (an improved version of the M1919A4), but some were later fitted with a M2 Browning and a M1919A3. The turret was regarded as unsatisfactory by soldiers, as it was cramped and it proved difficult to keep the guns aimed when the vehicle was moving. The turret was also very slow to rotate, which led to delays in engaging targets. To free up space, the right-hand side L3A3 machine gun was removed from all the T50 turrets in South Vietnam by early 1970; these guns were instead fitted to the roof of the turret using a pintle mount. Fitting the machine gun on the turret roof also allowed it to be quickly brought to bear on targets, though the commander lacked armoured protection while using the weapon. The Australian Army is one of only two M113 operators to have fitted turrets to the type.

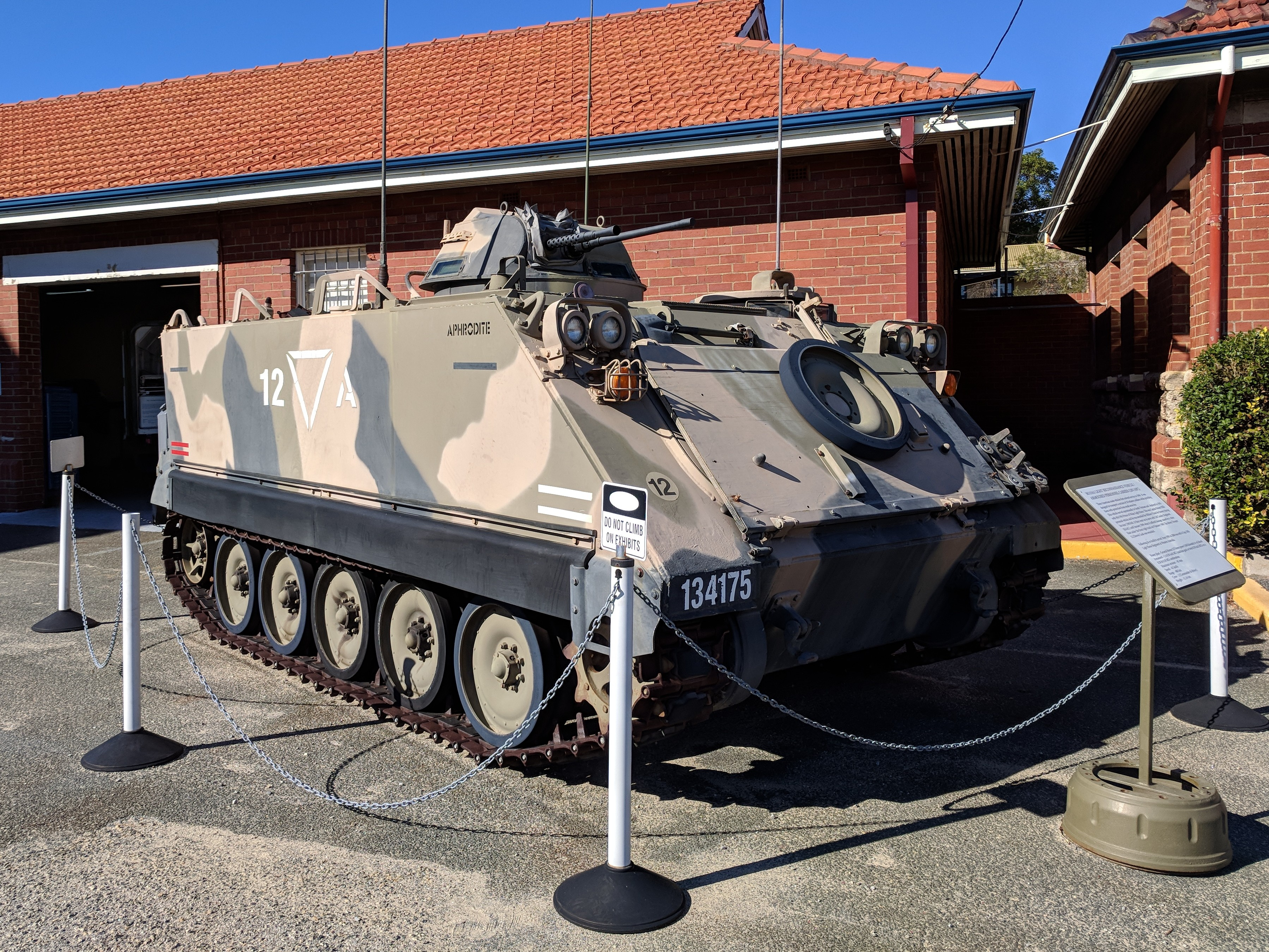
A retired M113A1 APC fitted with a T50 turret

Combat experience also led to improved protection against land mines. From July 1969, an armoured plate was welded to the sponson above the first three road wheels on each side of vehicles. This modification was eventually fitted to all Australian M113s. From May 1970, all of the Army's M113s were also fitted with a shock-absorbing footrest for the driver. Finally, a 38-millimetre (1.5 in) thick aluminium armoured plate was installed on the underside of all M113s starting from August 1970. While the plate added an extra 680 kilograms (1,500 lb) in weight, this was considered acceptable given the improvement to crew protection. The addition of the armoured plate led to a large reduction in casualties from mine explosions. The armoured plates were removed from the underside of the M113s following the Australian Army's withdrawal from South Vietnam as they slightly hindered the type's mobility and it was not considered necessary to retain them in peacetime. The plates were placed in storage.

During 1967 a M113A1 in South Vietnam was fitted with a 7.62 mm GAU-2B/A Minigun on an experimental basis. The gun was mounted on the commander's cupola. This was undertaken to improve the vehicle's firepower. The gun proved unsatisfactory, as it was very difficult to accurately aim and keep supplied with ammunition. The problems with aiming the gun meant that it could not be safely used to support infantry. It was also judged that few targets the Australian Army was likely to encounter required this much firepower. As a result, the project was abandoned.

In 1969 three M113A1s were modified in South Vietnam to dedicated mine clearance vehicles. These M113A1s were fitted with a boom of truck tyres on each side of their hull, which were used to detonate mines. They were also later modified to be driven from the turret. These APCs were operated by the 1st Field Squadron, which nicknamed them Her Majesty's APC (HMAPC) Flint, HMAPC Steele and HMAPC George. These vehicles proved successful in helping to clear a large barrier minefield that had originally been laid by Australian forces but was being used as a source of mines by the Communist forces they were fighting.

=== Fire support vehicles ===
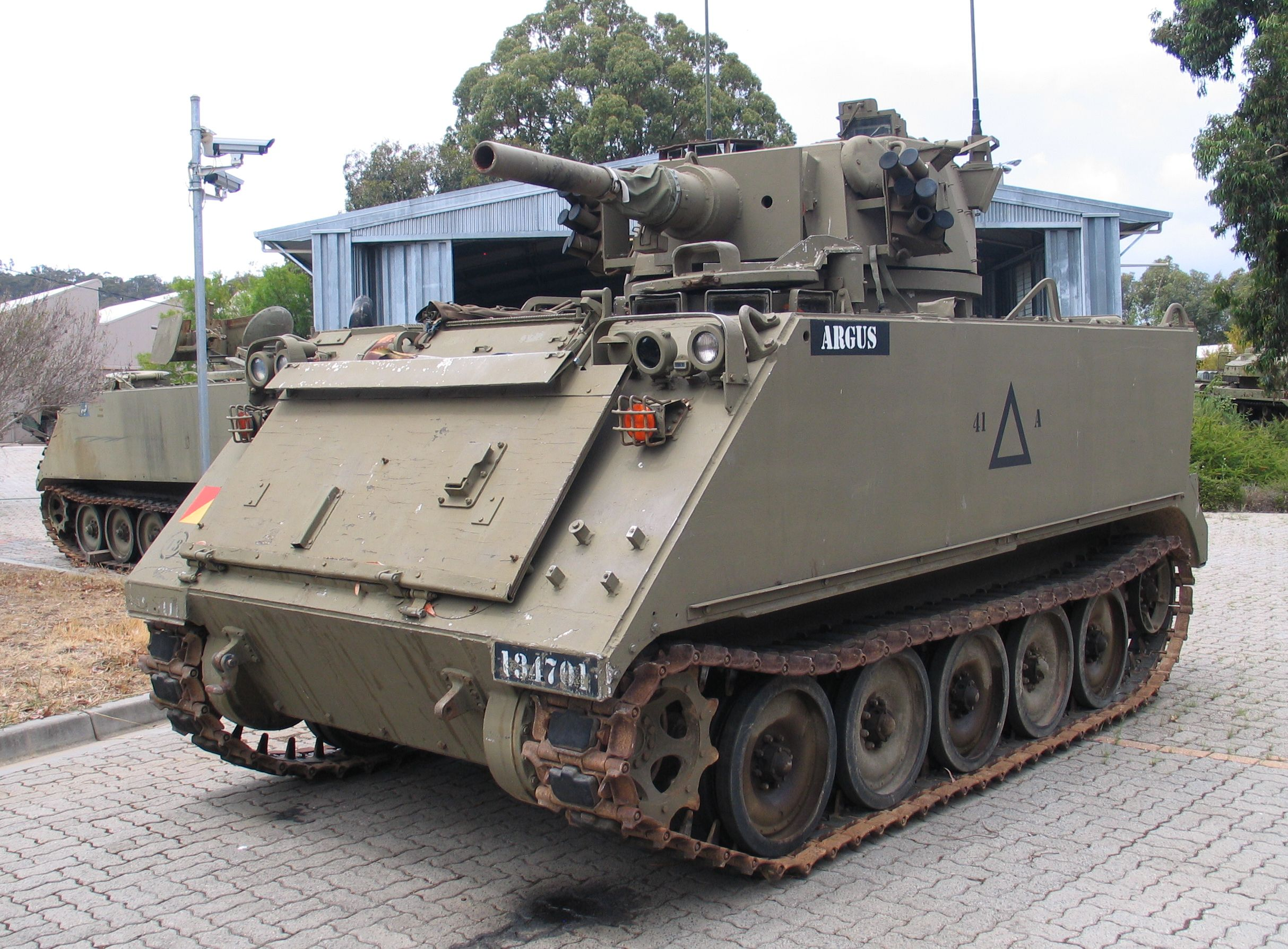
A M113A1 Fire Support Vehicle on display at the Royal Australian Armoured Corps Memorial and Army Tank Museum

Experience in South Vietnam led to the development of fire support variants of the M113 armed with medium-calibre guns. These variants were unique to Australia.

The initial M113A1 FSVs were fitted with a turret taken from the Army's Alvis Saladin armoured cars. This was intended to be an interim design, used until an air-portable armoured fighting vehicle was procured. The turret was armed with a 76 mm L5A1 gun which could fire high explosive, canister and smoke rounds. One .30 calibre machine gun was mounted coaxially with the 76 mm gun, and another was installed on the roof of the turret.

Trials of the M113A1 FSV began in 1967, and continued for almost three years. Two M551 Sheridan light tanks were also trialled in Australia during early 1968 to determine if this type could meet the requirement for an air-portable armoured fighting vehicle. This included comparative trials against a M113A1. The trials found that the Sheridan was unsuitable, which led to a decision to accelerate the M113A1 FSV project. Production of M113A1 FSVs commenced during 1970, and involved fitting newly acquired M113A1s with Saladin turrets. The work was undertaken by 4 Base Workshop Royal Australian Electrical and Mechanical Engineers (RAEME) at Bandiana, Victoria. A total of 15 were produced, using the turrets of all the Australian Army's Saladins.

The development of a second tranche of FSVs began in 1972, when a requirement for further such AFVs was issued. It was decided that the new AFV would use the turret of a FV101 Scorpion fitted to the chassis of a M113A1 APC. This turret was armed with a 76 mm L23A1 gun. Buoyancy aids were also installed on the sides and front of the hull so that the vehicles remained amphibious. The prototype vehicles began to be constructed by the Ordnance Factory in Maribyrnong, Victoria, during 1974; three were completed in mid-1975. The design was approved for production in 1978, and another 45 FSVs were eventually completed by converting newly acquired M113A1s. The type was later designated the Medium Reconnaissance Vehicle (MRV).

=== Post-Vietnam modifications ===
Despite the T50 turret's shortcomings, it remained in service with all of the M113A1 APCs for over 30 years. Minor modifications were made to improve the turret's performance, but it was never considered genuinely satisfactory. For instance, the turret lacked predictive gun sights and had no integral night vision capabilities. An improved variant of the turret was developed during 1990 and early 1991; this design sought to address problems with the weapons mounting, gun sight and ammunition feed system. The variant also had improved elevation and transverse systems.

In the late 1980s, several M113A1s were modified to carry RASIT ground surveillance radars and AN/TAS 6A Thermal Imaging Units. These vehicles were assigned to the 2nd Cavalry Regiment's Surveillance Troop.

=== Other variants ===
Between February and May 1965 a M113 command and reconnaissance vehicle on loan from the US Army was trialled near Innisfail. Two command and reconnaissance variants of the M114 armoured fighting vehicle had been trialled in early 1964. These trials produced mixed results, and it was decided to not purchase either AFV.

In late 1971 a mine-damaged M113A1 was converted to a mechanical training aid. This comprised the forward section of the vehicle that was mounted on a stand so that instructors and students could easily observe its mechanical layout.

=== Numbers ===
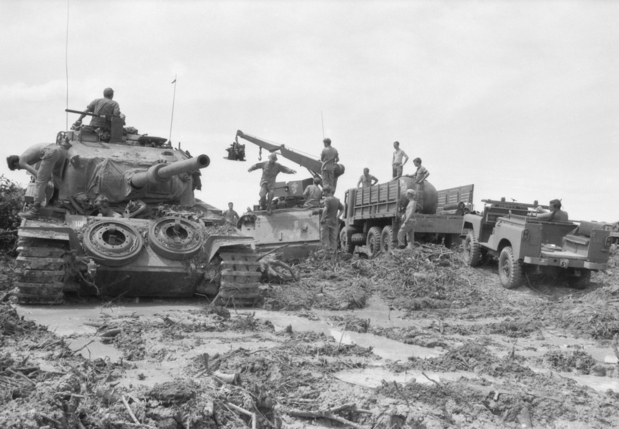
A M113A1 Fitters vehicle delivering equipment for a Centurion tank during an operation in South Vietnam

The total numbers of M113s acquired by the Australian Army differ between sources:

M113 variants acquired by the Australian Army
Variant	Years acquired	Cecil	Houston & Handel	Notes
M113 APC	1962	2		Used for trials
M113A1 APC	1965–78	499	476	Two converted to FSVs
M113A1 APC (ambulance)	1965–78	9	46	
M113A1 Fitters	1965–73	41	41	
M125A1	1965–75	23	22	
M577A1	1965–74	58	70	
M113A1 FSV	1969	15	15	Included one M113A1 purchased in 1965
M548 TLC	1970–79	103	103	
M806A1 ARVL	1971–73	19	19	
M113A1 MRV	1972–73	48	48	
Totals		817	840	

== M113AS4 variants ==
=== M113 upgrade program ===
A project to replace the M113s began in the 1980s, but was abandoned in favour of upgrading the type. In October 1980 the Army initiated Project Waler which aimed to replace the M113s with new armoured vehicles by the mid-1990s. Between 500 and 1,000 AFVs were to be procured, the Army considering both wheeled and tracked armoured vehicles. A total of 14 companies submitted proposals to initial phase of the project, that closed in February 1982. Three proposals were selected for further consideration in July that year; each comprised four different wheeled and tracked options. Project Waler was cancelled in July 1985, the government deciding to upgrade the M113 fleet instead. Minister for Defence Kim Beazley stated that while the designs under consideration for Project Waler would have been superior to the M113, they would be very costly to procure. The Canberra Times reported that it had also proven difficult to tailor the designs to Australian conditions, and that the government regarded them as unsuited to Australia's needs.

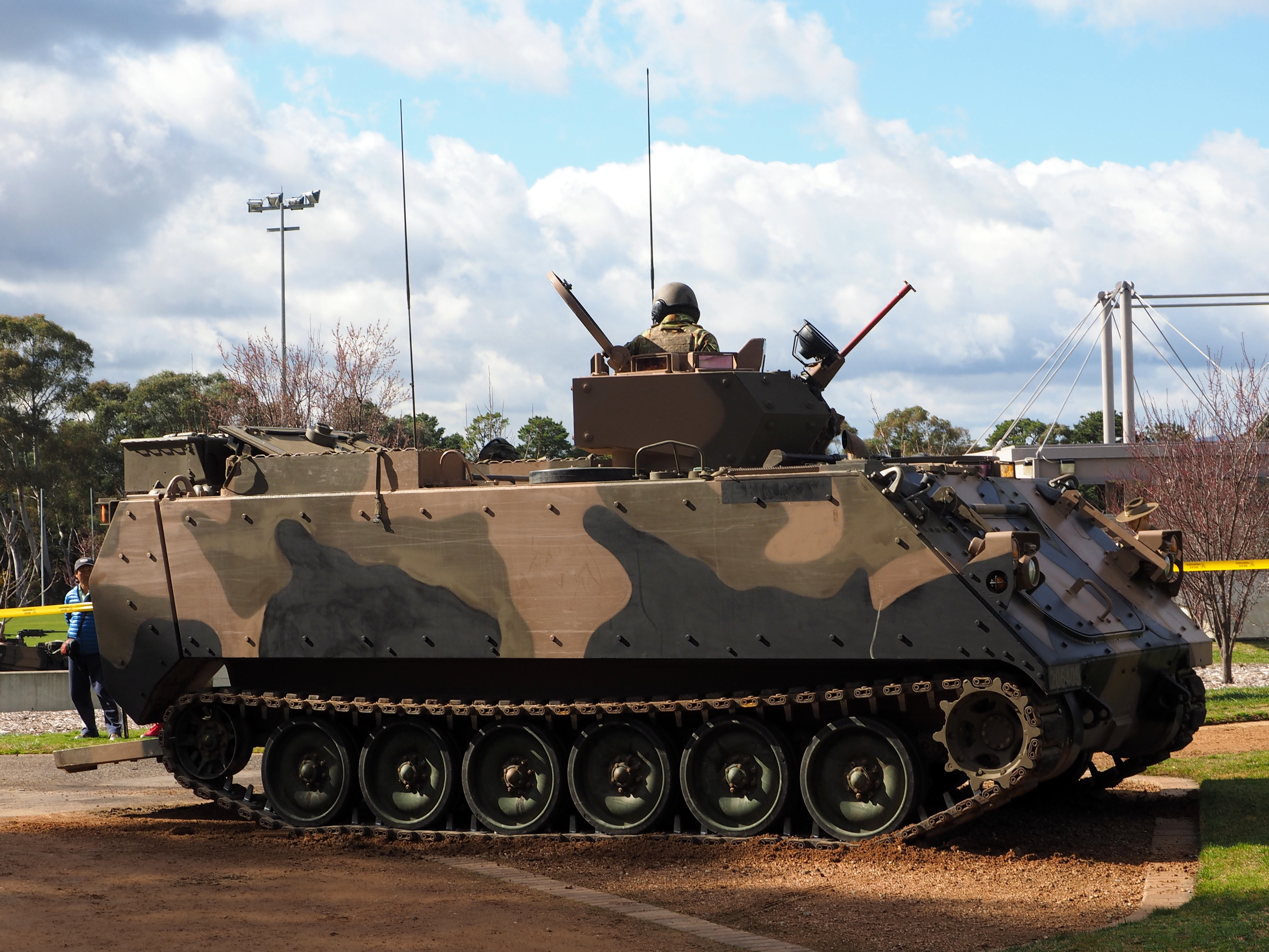
A M113AS4 APC in 2015

Work on the upgrade project began in the early 1990s. The 1992 Defence Review found that the M113 fleet could remain viable until 2010 if the vehicles were upgraded. This finding was generally supported within the Army, though there were concerns over whether it would be economical to retain the M113s until 2010. The Department of Defence agreed to a limited upgrade of 537 M113A1s in October 1992, and the government approved the project in November the next year.

In 1994 the Army decided to split the project into two phases. Under Phase 1, the vehicles' suspension and engine cooling systems would be upgraded to M113A2 standard and they would be fitted with a new turret, spall liners and a cooled drinking water system. Night-vision goggles would also be acquired for M113 drivers and commanders. As part of Phase 2, the vehicles would be upgraded further to M113A3 standard, which would involve fitting them with a new engine, a new transmission system, appliqué armour and a climate control system. Tenix Defence was selected as the prime contractor for Phase 1, the contract being signed in May 1997. Tenix delivered four M113A2s in 1998, and they were used for trials by the School of Armour and B Squadron, 3rd/4th Cavalry Regiment between August and October that year.

In November 1997 Tenix proposed combining both phases of the upgrade program. The Department of Defence accepted this proposal in November 1998, but further design and developmental work demonstrated that the intended savings from combining the phases would not eventuate. As a result, the Department of Defence cancelled all further work on this approach to the upgrade program in October 2000. The Army and Department of Defence remained committed to upgrading the M113s, however.

The 2000 Defence White Paper included a commitment to upgrade 350 M113s to improve their capabilities and retain the type in service until around 2020. As part of the development of a business case for the upgrade, consideration was given to replacing the M113s with infantry fighting vehicles (IFVs) such as the American M2 Bradley. It was decided to not procure IFVs on the grounds that they would be too expensive and difficult to deploy by air given their weight. The Cabinet approved the M113 Major Upgrade Project in June 2002, and a contract was signed with Tenix the next month. While it was intended that the upgraded M113s would begin to enter service in the second half of 2006, technical problems with the prototype vehicles led to delays. These delays were in addition to those caused by the mismanagement of the upgrade project, which was extensively criticised by the Australian National Audit Office (ANAO) in 2005. In particular, the ANAO noted that the project had suffered "extensive scope changes and chronic schedule delays since its inception", the Department of Defence doing a poor job of managing the project until the Major Upgrade Project contract was signed in 2002. In 2008 the government approved the upgrade of a further 81 M113s, taking the total to 431.

The M113s were upgraded at Tenix's facilities in Bandiana. The work on the vehicles included stripping them back to bare hulls, lengthening the latter ones by 666 mm, and then installing new engines (MTU 6V 199 TE20, 11.9 litre diesel, 350 bhp (260 kW) @2100 rpm), armour and a range of other modifications.

The Department of Defence accepted the first upgraded M113s in November 2007. The next year the Parliamentary Secretary for Defence Procurement announced that the technical problems affecting the vehicles had been resolved, and the upgrade project had been removed from the Defence Projects of Concern List. The cost of the hull extension quickly rose from the initial estimate of about $50 thousands to $100 thousands and more, as most hulls needed expensive repair before lengthening. The last upgraded M113 was accepted in September 2012.

By the time the M113 upgrade project was complete, the operational environment had changed with a new threat improvised explosive devices (IEDs) that made the vehicles unsuitable for combat. Although the hull had been reinforced during the upgrade to "improve mine blast protection" it did not provide protection against large IEDs. The vehicles also did not provide adequate protection against most forms of modern anti-tank missiles and anti-tank mines. The shortcomings of the upgraded M113s left the Army with a significant capability gap, requiring a replacement project to be launched.

The M113s that were not upgraded were disposed of. In 2000, a M113A1 that had been deployed to South Vietnam, Rwanda and East Timor was transferred to the Australian War Memorial. The Memorial later received a M577A1. As of 2016, a further 201 M113s were to be scrapped and 31 preserved for heritage purposes.

=== Variants ===
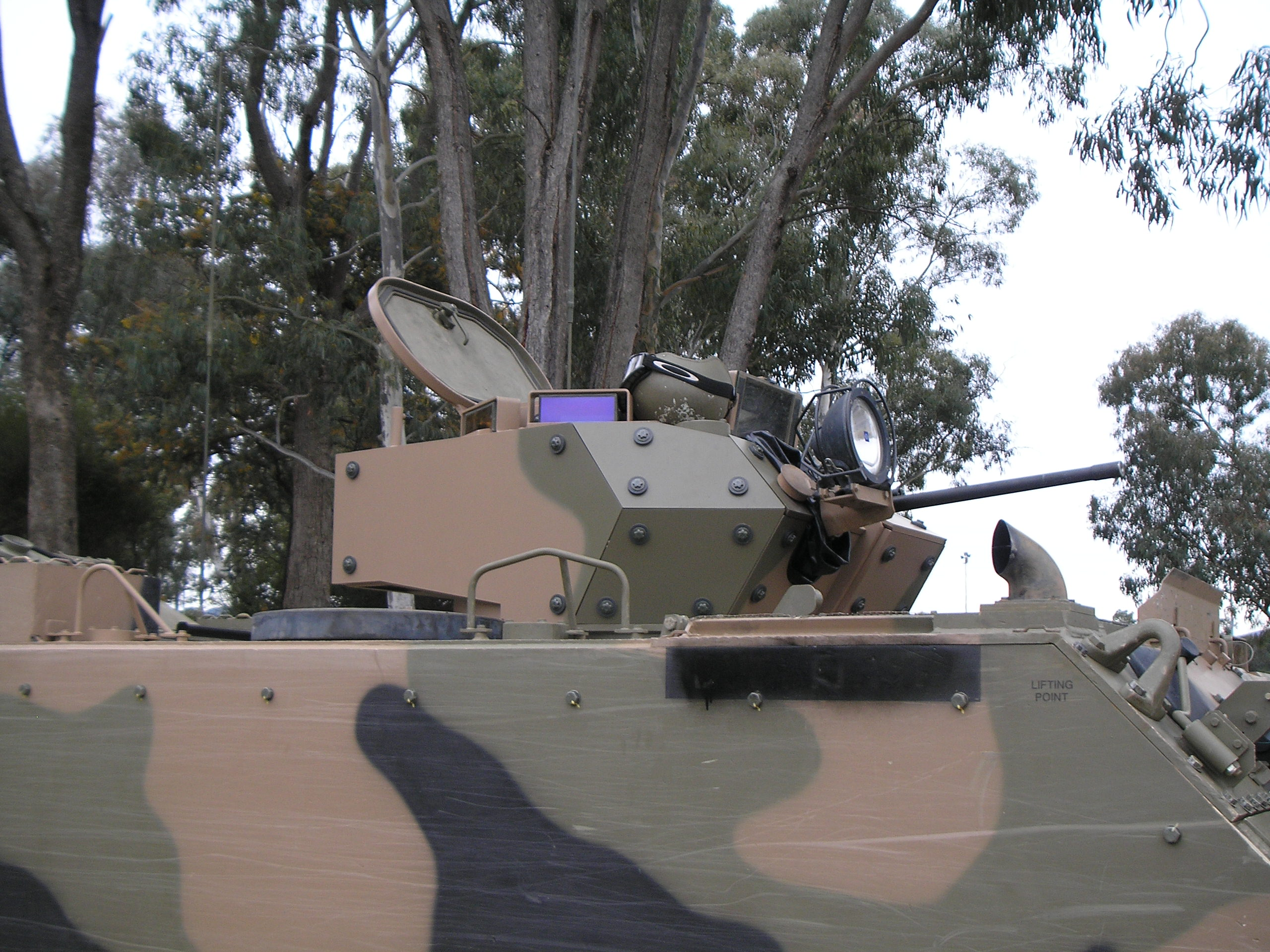
The new turret fitted to M113AS4 APCs

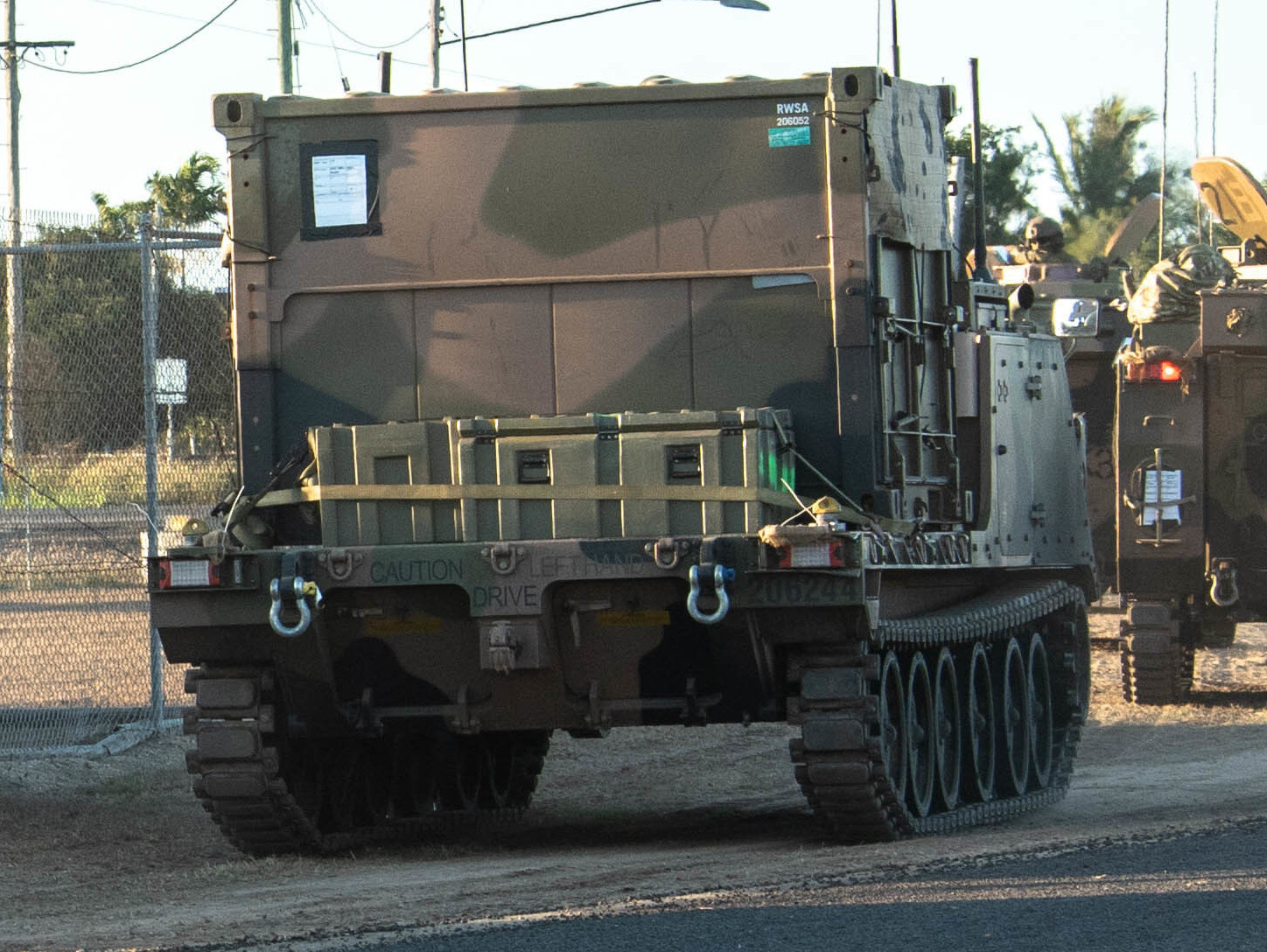
A M113AS4 Armoured Logistics Vehicle viewed from the rear

The upgrade program involved seven variants:

Upgraded M113 variants acquired by the Australian Army
Variant	Number built	Notes
M113AS4 Armoured Personnel Carrier	252	Fitted with a T150F turret, which replaced the T50 turret. The turret is armed with a M2 HB Quick Change Barrel (QCB) 12.7mm machine gun, and is electrically powered and fitted with a day/night gun sight.
M113AS3 Armoured Ambulance (AA)	15	Equipped to carry medical equipment and transport wounded personnel.
M125AS3 Armoured Mortar (AM)	21	Equipped with an 81 mm mortar.
M577AS3 Armoured Command Vehicle (ACV)	43	A command variant updating the older M577A1 series to the AS3 standard.
M113AS4 Armoured Fitters Vehicle (AF)	38	Has a more powerful crane than the M113A1 Fitters vehicle's to be able to lift the upgraded M113s' heavier engine. When armed the vehicle is fitted with the ACAV protection kit for the gunner instead of having a T150F turret.
M806AS4 Armoured Recovery Vehicle Light (ARVL)	12	Equipped with a more powerful winch than the M806A1 ARVL. When armed the vehicle is fitted with the ACAV protection kit for the gunner instead of having a T150F turret.
M113AS4 Armoured Logistics Vehicle (ALV)	50	The rear half of the vehicle has been cut out and replaced with a flatbed to carry cargo. None of the M548A1s were upgraded to this standard, instead this variant was built on existing M113A1 hulls by extending them. Fitted with the ACAV protection kit for the gunner instead of having a T150F turret.

All of the variants other than the M806AS4 ARVL were built on extensively upgraded M113A1 APC hulls. M806A1 ARVLs were converted to M806AS4s. All AS4 variants have lengthened hulls, with the number of road wheels being increased from five to six, unlike the AS3 variants which have remained the same in length. Common upgrades to all variants include new suspension, a new power pack and engine, the addition of spall liners and appliqué armour, increased external stowage and the fuel tanks being moved from inside to outside the hull. All upgraded vehicles have been fitted with new T150F tracks and sprockets. The height and width of the AFVs was also increased. These modifications added 2.5 tonnes (2.8 short tons) of weight for the AS3 variants and up to 5.5 tonnes (6.1 short tons) for the AS4 variants. As a result of their larger dimensions, the upgraded M113s cannot be transported by air or road without some elements being disassembled and fewer can be embarked on each transport ship. They also lost their amphibious capabilities.

In 2019 two M113AS4 APCs were converted to optionally crewed combat vehicles by BAE Systems Australia. These vehicles were used by the Army for trials to improve its understanding of how uncrewed vehicles could be used, the head of the project stating that "we are using M113s because we have them in service and we understand them really well." By 2022 the Army had a force of 20 optionally crewed M113AS4 which were being used for further trials.

During Exercise Talisman Sabre 2025, the Australian Army trialled an M113AS4 armed with a remote-control turret, equipped with an M134 Minigun.

== Operational history ==
=== Vietnam War ===
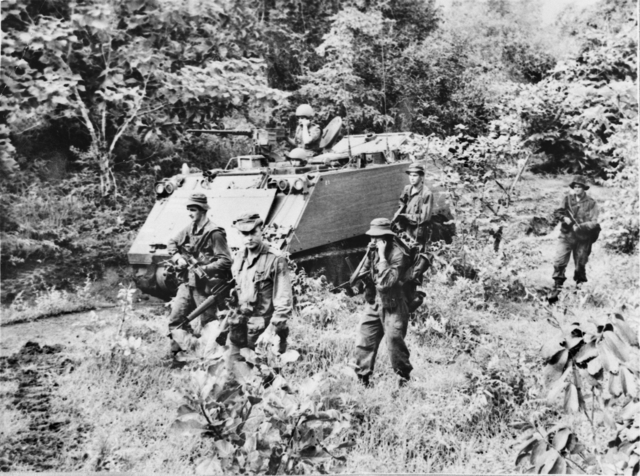
Australian soldiers patrolling with a M113A1 in August 1966

==== Numbers deployed ====
M113s were extensively used by the Australian Army during the Vietnam War. M113A1, M113A1 Fitters vehicle, M577A1, M125A1 and M113A1 FSVs were deployed to South Vietnam, where they were employed in a wide range of roles.

A troop of eight M113A1s from the 4th/19th Prince of Wales's Light Horse was assigned to the first Australian combat unit to deploy to South Vietnam, the 1st Battalion, Royal Australian Regiment (1 RAR), and left Australia in May 1965. Two other M113A1s were allocated to this force as a reserve. The troop had replaced its wheeled APCs with M113A1s only shortly before departing for South Vietnam, and had conducted little training with the type. Further M113A1s and two M125A1 mortar carriers were dispatched in September that year.

The APC force in South Vietnam was expanded to a squadron in 1966; this force was initially designated the 1st Armoured Personnel Carrier Squadron and was renamed A Squadron, 3rd Cavalry Regiment in September 1967. At the time the 1st Armoured Personnel Carrier Squadron was established, the M113 fleet in South Vietnam was increased, with M113A1 Fitters variants and M577A1 ACVs joining the force. The squadron was redesignated B Squadron, 3rd Cavalry Regiment in mid-1969 and A Squadron, 3rd Cavalry Regiment in April 1971. While infantry units rotated in and out of South Vietnam as formed bodies, RAAC personnel were posted individually.

The cavalry squadron usually comprised a squadron headquarters, three cavalry troops, a support troop and a light aid detachment. Each of the cavalry troops was equipped with thirteen M113A1s, and was organised into a headquarters with four APCs and three sections each with three APCs. The tank squadron which also formed part of the 1st Australian Task Force (1 ATF) between February 1968 and August 1971 was allocated two M113A1 APCs, three M113A1 Fitters vehicles and a M577A1 ACV to support the Centurion tanks. During the final stage of the withdrawal of Australian forces from South Vietnam, the cavalry squadron was reduced to a single troop equipped with 12 M113A1s, 6 Fire Support Vehicles, 2 M125s and a M577 from December 1971. The role of this troop was to protect the Australian logistics base at Vung Tau. The last Australian M113s left South Vietnam in May 1972.

Overall, 200 M113s were deployed to South Vietnam. This made the type the most numerous armoured fighting vehicle used by the Australian Army during the war. The M113s were returned to Australia to be rebuilt after reaching a set mileage; only three were deployed twice.

M113 variants deployed to South Vietnam
Variant	Number deployed
M113A1	163
M113A1 Fitters	11
M125A1	10
M577A1	8
M113A1 FSV	8

==== Employment ====
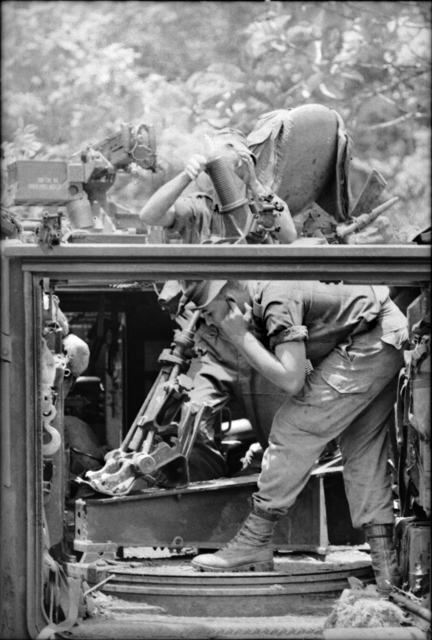
A mortar being fired from an Australian M125A1 mortar carrier in August 1966

The M113A1s were mainly used as armoured personnel carriers, and transported troops in and out of battle. In this role they were able to carry an infantry section with all of its combat equipment. The Battle of Long Tan on 18 August 1966 was the first major engagement involving Australian M113A1s. During this battle a troop of APCs carrying a company of infantry played a key role in preventing another Australian infantry company from being overrun.

M113A1s operated in other roles. These included escorting convoys, conducting independent patrols and carrying supplies. They were also employed in ambushes and cordon and search operations. The M113A1s supported artillery units by transporting L5 Pack Howitzers internally and towing the larger M2A2 howitzers. During the later years of the Australian deployment to South Vietnam, when 1 ATF's area of operations was largely secure, groups of M113A1s frequently operated without infantry in a reconnaissance role. M113A1s proved to be highly effective, as they provided mobility, protection and firepower to support infantry operations, but their thin armour left them vulnerable to mines and other anti-tank weapons. Operations were at times hindered by infantry units not being sufficiently trained to make the best use of M113s' capabilities.

M125A1 mortar carriers were usually used to provide fire support for the infantry with their 81mm mortar. They were also often employed as armoured personnel carriers with their mortar removed.

The M113A1 Fitters variants were assigned to the light aid detachments that formed part of cavalry and tank squadrons. They were operated by RAEME personnel, and were heavily employed at both Australian Army bases and in the field during operations. The variant's crane proved particularly useful. Australia was the only country to use this M113 variant in the Vietnam War.

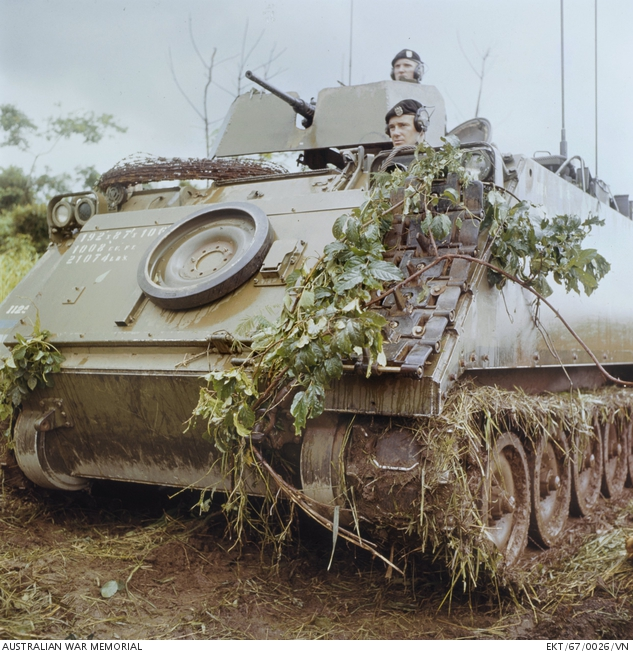
A M113A1 fitted with a gun shield in 1968

Each cavalry and tank squadron headquarters was assigned a single M577A1, and a further five were allocated to the headquarters of 1 ATF. 547 Signal Troop, 1 ATF's signals intelligence element, was assigned an M577A1 from late 1968 and used it to support large-scale operations. The radio fit outs differed between M577A1s depending on their assigned role. The M577A1s were often stationed at fire support bases, and were rarely used in patrols and convoy escort tasks.

The first M113A1 FSVs arrived in Vietnam during July and August 1971, and were initially used to establish a fire support troop in A Squadron, 3rd Cavalry Regiment. Six were allocated to the squadron, and two others were held in reserve. After the Centurion tanks were withdrawn, the FSVs were assigned to support infantry units. They were used for patrols, protecting foliage-clearing teams and defending fixed positions, and typically operated with M113A1s. The FSVs proved unsatisfactory replacements for the Centurions, as they were too lightly armoured. The vehicles were also prone to throwing tracks, became bogged more easily than standard M113s and lacked gun sights for their main armament during the first months of their deployment. 1 ATF soon concluded that the FSVs were almost useless, and they never saw combat. The vehicles were withdrawn from South Vietnam in February 1972.

Many of the M113s deployed to South Vietnam were damaged, most frequently by mines. In many cases the damage could be repaired in theatre, but 23 M113A1s and a M125A1 were written off. Most of these vehicles' hulls were shipped back to Australia for disposal. A further 28 M113s were returned to Australia for repair after incurring damage which was beyond the capabilities of the Army workshops in South Vietnam to handle. Of these M113s, 15 had sustained such serious damage that they needed to be rebuilt using newly purchased hulls. The cavalry squadron incurred significant casualties, 20 of its members being killed (including 17 in action) and 110 being seriously wounded in action; this represented approximately one in seven of the officers and men that served in it between 1966 and 1972. Many others suffered minor injuries. A M113A1 that was damaged in combat in South Vietnam was donated by the Army to the Australian War Memorial on 19 April 1972. The APC was later removed from the Memorial due to health and safety concerns and transferred to the Royal Australian Armoured Corps Memorial and Army Tank Museum.

Extensive training was undertaken in Australia to prepare soldiers and units for service in South Vietnam. During 1969 alone M113s in Australia were driven for 530,000 miles (850,000 km) during training. Soldiers were trained by the squadron of the 3rd Cavalry Regiment which was stationed in Australia at the time immediately before being posted to the squadron in South Vietnam.

=== After Vietnam ===
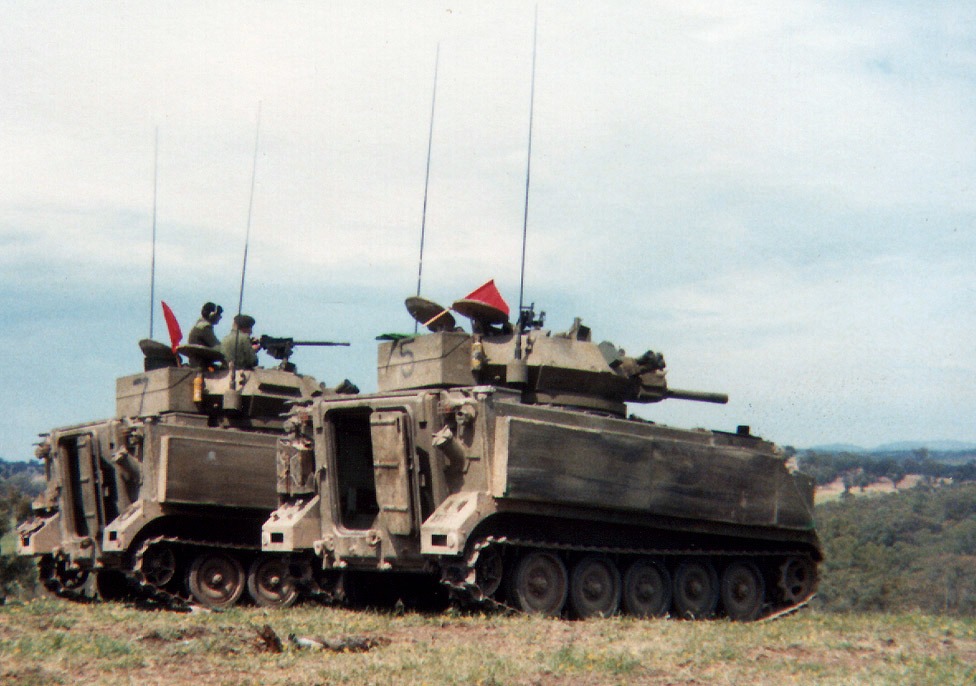
M113A1 MRVs from the 1st/15th Royal New South Wales Lancers at a range shoot at Puckapunyal, Victoria in 1988

In mid-1970 the M113A1 fitted with a T50 turret was selected as the standard vehicle for all RAAC units other than the armoured regiments, which primarily used tanks. The CMF RAAC units were each authorised eight M113A1s to replace their obsolete armoured cars, as well as a single M577A1 ACV. Deliveries of these M113s were completed in 1972. By this time, all the CMF RAAC units had been organised as cavalry or APC formations. The M113A1 FSVs were used by regular cavalry regiments and the Armoured Centre until 1979, when they were transferred to Army Reserve units.

The Australian Army began to develop a mechanised infantry capability during the late 1970s. The 5th/7th Battalion, Royal Australian Regiment (5/7 RAR) began trialling mechanised tactics beginning in 1976. This reform aimed to improve the unit's mobility, and make better use of the capabilities of the APCs. The battalion was fully mechanised by mid-1977; in this role it was equipped with 72 M113s. Following the Sydney Hilton Hotel bombing in February 1978, 50 of 5/7 RAR's M113s were stationed along the Hume Highway to protect national leaders as they travelled from Sydney to Bowral for the Commonwealth Heads of Government Regional Meeting. There was scepticism within Army Headquarters over the cost-effectiveness of mechanisation and the viability of maintaining a single mechanised battalion. At the conclusion of the mechanisation trial in mid-1978, only one company of 5/7 RAR was retained as a mechanised unit with the others reverting to light infantry.

In early 1983 a decision was made to permanently convert 5/7 RAR to a fully mechanised unit. The battalion transitioned to this role between July 1983 and 1984. Some supporting elements of the 1st Brigade were also mechanised. 5/7 RAR had completed its transformation to a mechanised battalion by 1986; as of early that year, it was equipped with 56 M113A1 APCs, 4 M125A1s, 4 M113A1 Fitters vehicles, 3 M577A1s, 1 M113 ARVL and 7 TLCs. The battalion cooperated closely with the 1st Armoured Regiment and a troop of mechanised engineers that was established within the 1st Field Squadron.

The M113 fleet saw some changes over the 1980s and 1990s. All of the Army's M113A1s were "grounded" between September 1982 and July 1983 due to serious problems affecting their control differential. This greatly disrupted training activities. An audit undertaken by the Australian National Audit Office in 1985 found serious problems with how the M113 fleet was being managed. This had led to only 488 of the Army's 790 M113s being serviceable. The M113A1 FSVs were retired in 1986, and six of the vehicles were sold to the New Zealand Army after being converted back to standard M113A1s. The 1987 Defence White Paper called for the number of M113s to be reduced to below 600, with some of the remaining vehicles being upgraded. The White Paper also recommended that the 2nd Cavalry Regiment's M113s be replaced with wheeled vehicles. The ASLAV was selected for this role in 1992. The 2nd Cavalry Regiment was converted to ASLAVs during 1995 and 1996. The M113A1 MRVs were withdrawn from service in late 1996 due to shortages of spare parts for their turrets and concerns that the fumes ejected when their main gun was fired were toxic.

In April 1993 a civilian stole a M113 from an Army facility in Perth, and rampaged through the city for two hours. The APC was used to damage the city's police headquarters, a police station, at least eight police cars and the Central Law Courts before the civilian was arrested by the Tactical Response Group. The man, who had been diagnosed with paranoid schizophrenia, was sentenced to four and half year's jail in December 1993.

=== Peacekeeping deployments ===
Between January and May 1993, B Squadron, 3rd/4th Cavalry Regiment was deployed to Somalia to support 1 RAR during the Operation Solace peacekeeping operation. The unit was equipped with 36 M113A1 variants, including 28 APCs and two M125A1 mortar carriers. This deployment proved successful, the vehicles being used in similar roles to those they had undertaken during the Vietnam War. Australian soldiers found that mechanised infantry tactics using the M113s were highly effective in what proved to be a low-intensity conflict. The M113s were obsolete in comparison to the armoured vehicles other western militaries deployed to Somalia. B Squadron had difficulty maintaining the M113s, due in particular to a shortage of links for their caterpillar tracks. It also experienced shortages of other spare parts. After the withdrawal of 1 RAR, a ten-man team from the Special Air Service Regiment that was deployed to Somalia in 1994 used two United Nations' M113s.

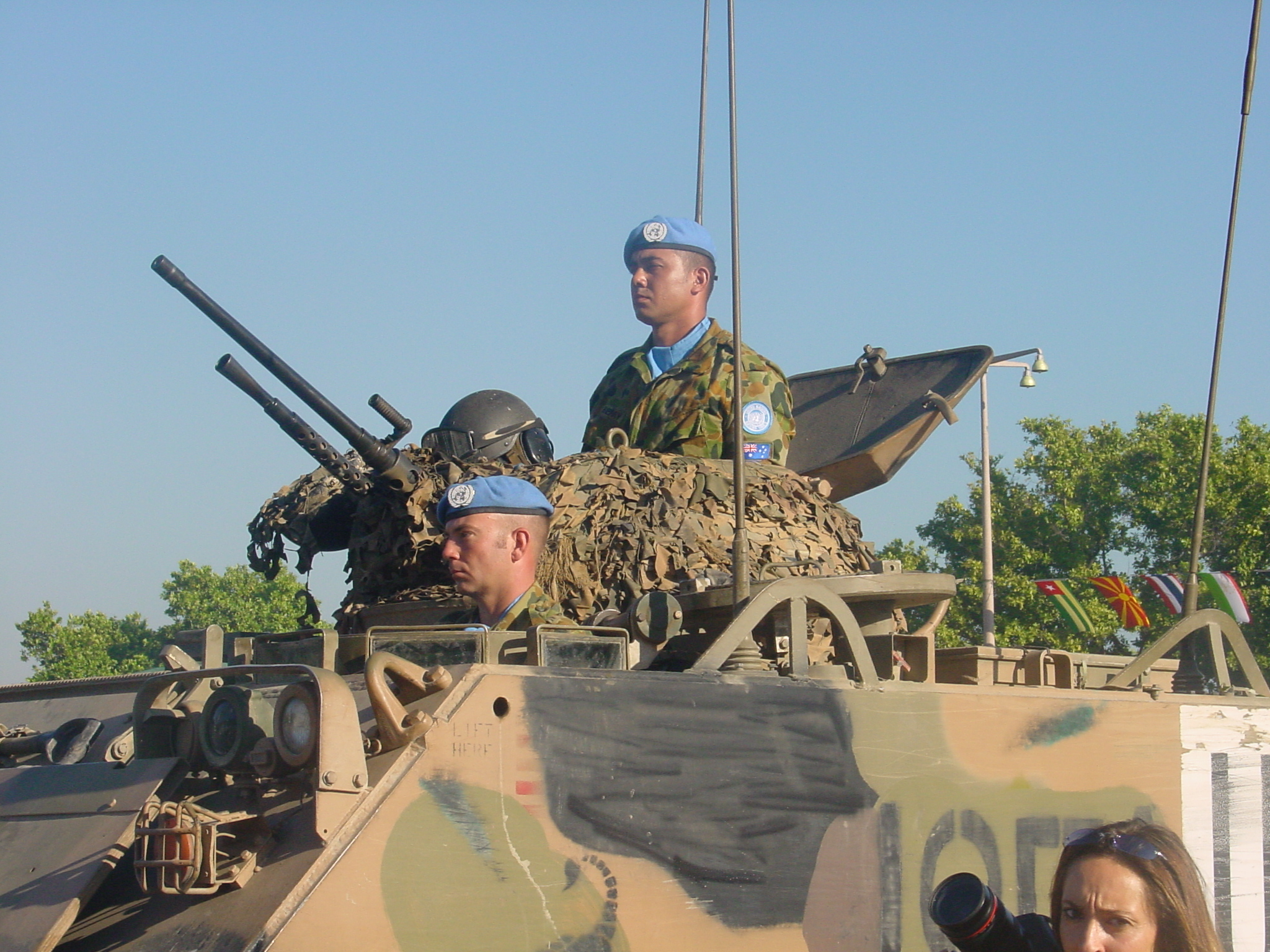
An Australian M113 in East Timor during 2002

Three M113A1 APCs and a M113A1 Fitters vehicle were deployed to Rwanda between 1994 and 1995. These vehicles were used to protect Australian Army medical teams that had been assigned to the United Nations Assistance Mission for Rwanda following the Rwandan genocide. The M113s were initially operated by B Squadron, 3rd/4th Cavalry Regiment, from August 1994 to March 1995, and 5/7 RAR subsequently. They were only occasionally used, as the Australian contingents did not face threats which required armoured support. Some of the Australian M113 crew members served as driving and gunnery instructors for a Ghana Army unit in Rwanda which had recently received 50 M113A1s donated by Germany and had not trained with the type before starting their deployment.

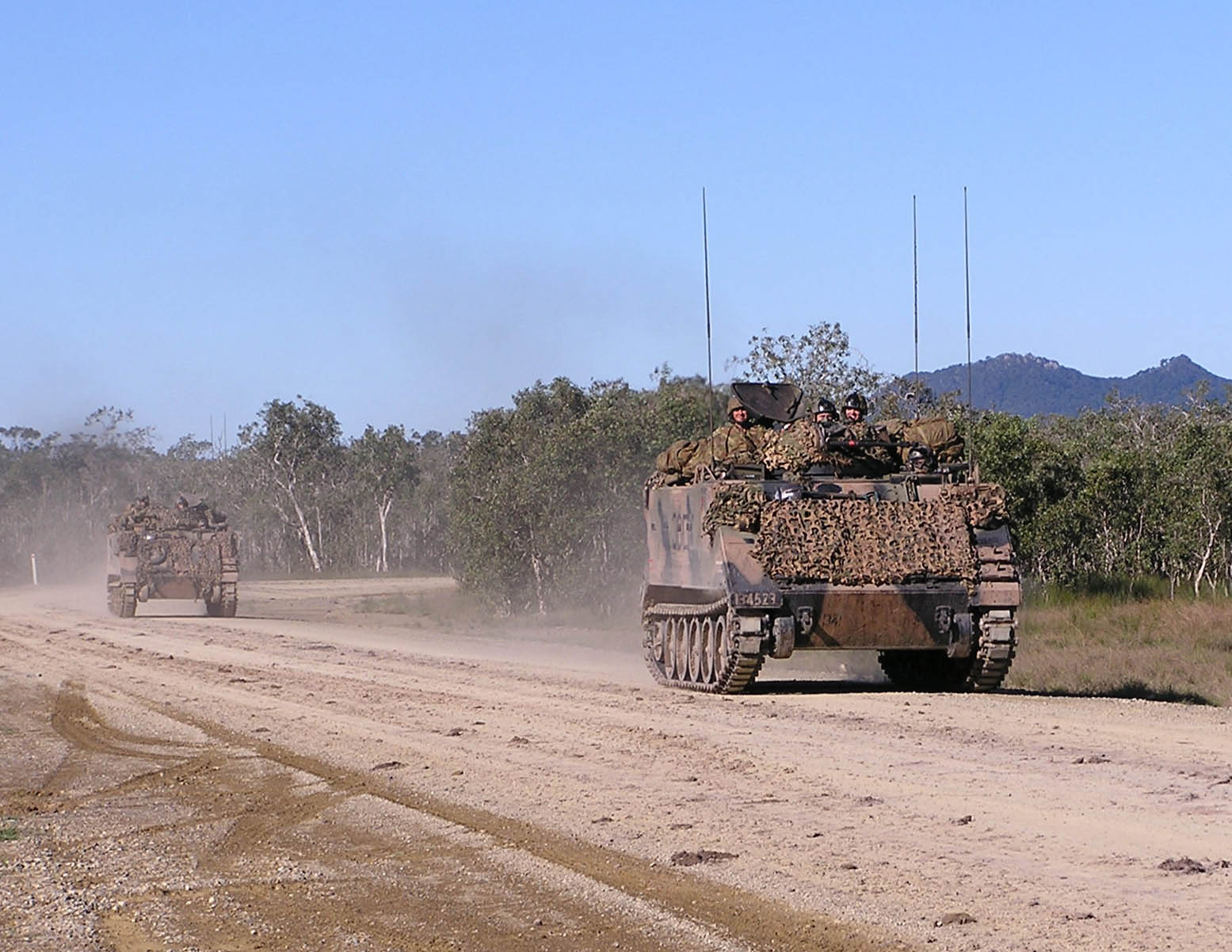
Two M113A1s during a military exercise in 2005

In September 1999, B Squadron, 3rd/4th Cavalry Regiment was deployed to East Timor as part of the INTERFET peacekeeping mission. The unit supported light infantry units, and its M113s proved better suited to East Timor's rugged terrain and tropical climate than the 2nd Cavalry Regiment's ASLAVs, which at times were unable to operate off-road due to muddy conditions. 5/7 RAR was subsequently deployed to East Timor and proved highly effective. It was found that the mechanised battalion could cover an area which had previously needed to be patrolled by several light infantry battalions. Australian M113s remained in East Timor until 2002 to support the infantry battalions deployed there. While the deployment of M113s to East Timor was considered successful, the age of the vehicles and their obsolescent communications and navigation systems proved to be a limitation; this included the absence of Global Positioning System equipment to aid navigation. There were also concerns regarding the lack of stabilisation and night sights for the vehicles' armament, and the driver being unable to use a night driving system which had a wide field of view. The M113s also proved less mechanically reliable than the newer ASLAVs, which were also better armed. The experiences gained from operating M113s in East Timor helped to validate and improve the Army's mechanised doctrine, and influenced the requirements which were set for the M113 upgrade project.

=== Plan Beersheba ===
The number of mechanised infantry units was increased in 2007 when 5/7 RAR was de-linked to form the 5th Battalion, Royal Australian Regiment (5 RAR) and 7th Battalion, Royal Australian Regiment (7 RAR). 7 RAR was the first combat unit to receive M113AS4s, with enough of the type to transport an infantry company being delivered in December 2007. Both battalions operated in the mechanised role until 2013, when they were converted to light infantry as part of the Plan Beersheba restructure. As part of this restructure, each of the Army's three brigades included two light infantry battalions that could access a squadron of M113s in the brigade's armoured cavalry regiment. This structure proved short-lived, and the 3rd Battalion, Royal Australian Regiment, 6th Battalion, Royal Australian Regiment and 7 RAR began converting to mechanised infantry units in 2018. This change was an interim measure to prepare infantry units to operate IFVs ahead of these vehicles being ordered and delivered.

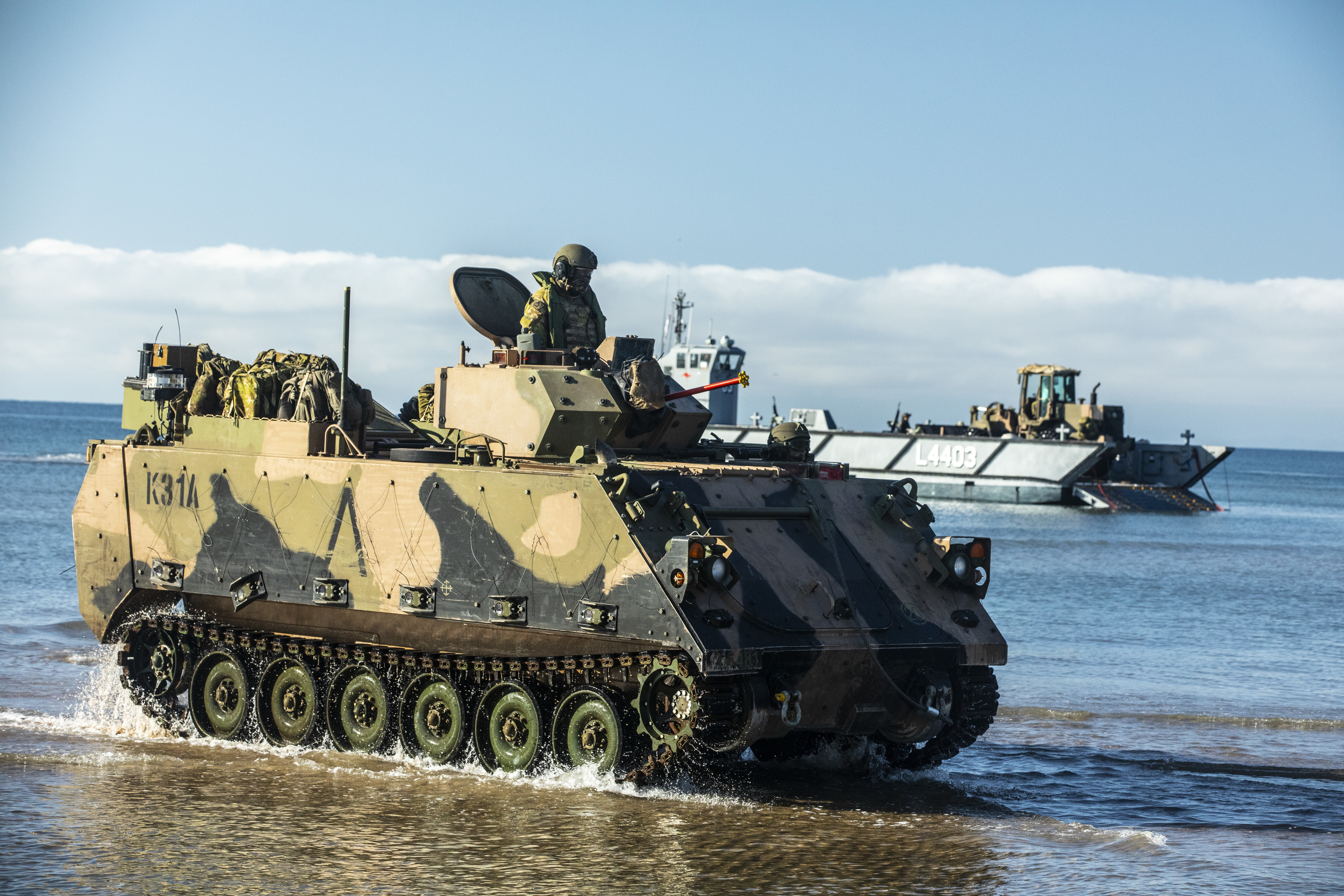
A M113AS4 coming ashore during an amphibious landing in 2021

The Army Reserve RAAC units were not issued with upgraded M113s, and their M113A1s were progressively withdrawn from service during the mid-2000s. Most of these units were converted to a light cavalry role, and initially re-equipped with unarmoured Land Rovers. As part of Plan Beersheba, all of the Army Reserve RAAC units received Bushmaster Protected Mobility Vehicles from 2011. These vehicles are used in both reconnaissance and armoured transport roles.

B Squadron, 3rd/4th Cavalry Regiment deployed 33 M113s and supporting vehicles again to East Timor in June 2006 as part of Operation Astute. M113s supported subsequent rotations of the ANZAC Battle Group until 2008, with 7 RAR providing mechanised infantry platoons during 2007 and 2008.

No M113s have been deployed to Afghanistan during the long-running Australian operations there as the Army considered them to be too vulnerable to improvised explosive devices and other threats. The type was also not included in the deployments of Australian Army units to Iraq between 2003 and 2008. In 2010 the Department of Defence advised a parliamentary committee that the upgraded M113s would require additional protection to be able to serve in Afghanistan, and that ASLAVs and Bushmasters were best suited to conditions there. The department also noted that it was unlikely that the M113s would ever be deployed to "a place where there is sustained close combat expected on a daily basis". In 2015, Australian Strategic Policy Institute analyst Andrew Davies described the M113s as "essentially obsolete" and "no longer fit for purpose in anything but a benign operational environment". All 431 upgraded M113s remained in service as of 2020.

On 19 May 2022, Defence Minister Peter Dutton announced that the government would gift 14 M113AS4s to Ukraine as part of Australia's assistance for the country following its invasion by Russia. The government had also committed to gift Bushmasters to Ukraine. On 4 July 2022, Defence Minister Richard Marles announced that the government had increased the number of M113AS4s to be gifted to 28. On 26 June 2023, the government announced that a further 28 M113s would be gifted to Ukraine.

== Replacement ==
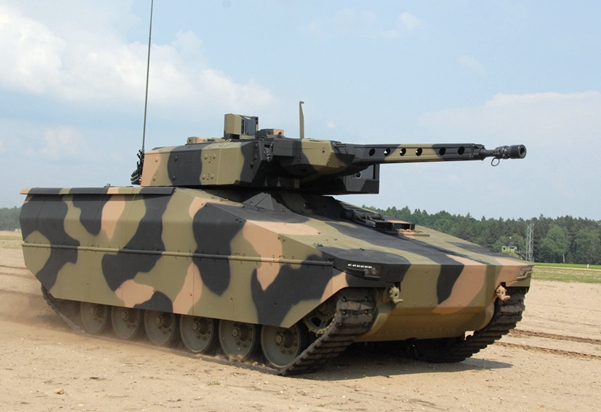
A Rheinmetall Lynx in Australian camouflage; this was one of the two designs considered to replace the Australian Army's M113s, with the AS21 Redback being selected instead

As part of the LAND 400 project, the Australian Government is currently aiming to procure IFVs to replace the M113s from 2025. The Army believes that the M113s are "not expected to be deployable for anything other than low intensity/low risk missions beyond 2025", and will reach the end of their service life in 2030. The introduction of IFVs will give the Australian Army a new capability, and better enable it to take part in high intensity warfare.

A request for tender for IFVs was issued in mid-2018. At this time, it was intended to acquire up to 450 IFVs as well as 17 manoeuvre support vehicles. In September 2019, Hanwha Defense Australia's AS21 Redback and Rheinmetall Defence Australia's Lynx IFVs were selected for further evaluation. The number of vehicles to be acquired was reduced to 300 in mid-2022. A decision on the type of IFV to be purchased was originally scheduled for 2022, but was delayed until 2023 to align with completion of a Defence Strategic Review in March that year. The ABC reported in October 2022 that there was speculation that the project may be cancelled due to its cost. In April 2023 the number of IFVs to be acquired was reduced to 129 to free up funding for other defence priorities. This will be sufficient to equip a single mechanised battalion. It was announced in July 2023 that the AS21 Redback had been selected, with deliveries to begin in 2027. M113s will remain in service with the Army's combat units until they are replaced by the new IFVs.
