= 1995 San Diego tank rampage =

Destruction wrought by stolen tank

- Date: May 17, 1995
- Time: 6:45 p.m. (UTC−07:00)
- Location: National Guard Armory and nearby San Diego
- Motive: Unknown
- Perpetrator: Shawn Nelson
- Outcome: Nelson killed by police
- Deaths: 1 (Nelson)
- Injuries: 0
- Property damage: US$149,201 (eq. $306,285 in 2025)

On May 17, 1995, 35-year-old Shawn Timothy Nelson stole an M60A3 tank from a local California Army National Guard armory in San Diego and drove six miles (9.7 km) through nearby neighborhoods, crushing cars and infrastructure in his path—though without injuring anyone.

Nelson was a native Californian and United States Army veteran with unusual habits that drew the attention of his neighbors. Leading up to the rampage, he had suffered financial, professional, and interpersonal setbacks, some of which stemmed from long-term substance abuse.

Nelson was able to steal the tank by entering through the armory gates, which were unlocked, and breaking off a padlock securing the tank. He drove the tank for about 25 minutes, first through residential streets and then on a highway, where the tank crashed and was partially disabled. San Diego police forced the hatch open and fatally shot Nelson.

Nelson's motives are unknown; at the time of his death, his blood alcohol content was twice the legal limit for driving. Police were criticized for not attempting to negotiate with Nelson or incapacitate him with tear gas, but the district attorney justified the shooting. The incident raised questions about military security at the Guard armory and spurred changes in California's tank storage. The Guard was held financially responsible for the damage to infrastructure and property.

== Background ==
=== Shawn Nelson ===
Shawn Nelson
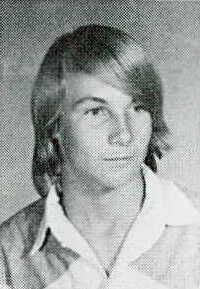
- Nelson in his 1976 high school yearbook
- Born: August 21, 1959; California, United States
- Died: May 17, 1995 (aged 35); California State Route 163; San Diego, California, US
- Cause of death: Gunshot wound
- Occupations: Soldier; plumber
- Spouse: Suzy Hellman (m. 1984; div. 1991)
- Military career
- Branch: United States Army
- Years: 1978–1980
- Rank: Private
- Unit: Armor Branch

Born on August 21, 1959, in California, Shawn Timothy Nelson was the second of Betty and Fred Nelson's three sons. He attended James Madison High School—where he was a sophomore during the 1975–1976 academic year, grew up in Clairemont, San Diego, and later married Suzy Hellman in 1984.

In 1978, Nelson enlisted in the United States Army and received training at Fort Knox. He was stationed in Germany with the Armor Branch as a tank commander. Private Nelson separated in 1980 due to "'multifaceted' disciplinary problems" with an honorable discharge. Afterwards, he began a successful career in plumbing, eventually starting his own San Diego business in 1991.

A patient at Sharp Memorial Hospital in 1990, Nelson later sued the hospital over a fight involving an emergency room security guard. Nelson sued them again in 1992 for malpractice, the same year his mother died there. The lawsuits were consolidated and dismissed in 1993. Nelson's brother would later say that Shawn Nelson "thought he got a raw deal there".

In Clairemont, Nelson was a minor celebrity for his unusual behavior. He spent nighttime hours mowing his lawn and digging for gold in a 20-foot (6.1 m) backyard pit, his property was covered in machine detritus and garbage, and police had visited nine times in 1994–95 "on calls ranging from reports of domestic violence to a complaint that Nelson's van had been stolen." He was renowned, but not well known by his neighbors.

Nelson long struggled with alcohol abuse and methamphetamine abuse, a factor in his wife leaving in 1991. Nelson's van and plumbing tools were stolen in June 1994, and his contracting business declined. By May 1995, Nelson had "a history of medical problems", including a spinal fracture caused by a motorcycle crash. Unemployed, his house on Willamette Avenue was being foreclosed upon, his utilities had been shut off, an eviction notice had been served, and he had recently broken up with a girlfriend. Nelson made "statements alluding to suicide".

=== Armory ===
The California National Guard armory in Linda Vista, San Diego, at 32.800612°N 117.161560°W, was surrounded by an eight-foot (2.4 m) chain-link fence, which was topped by three runs of barbed wire. Armory personnel usually left by 6 p.m.

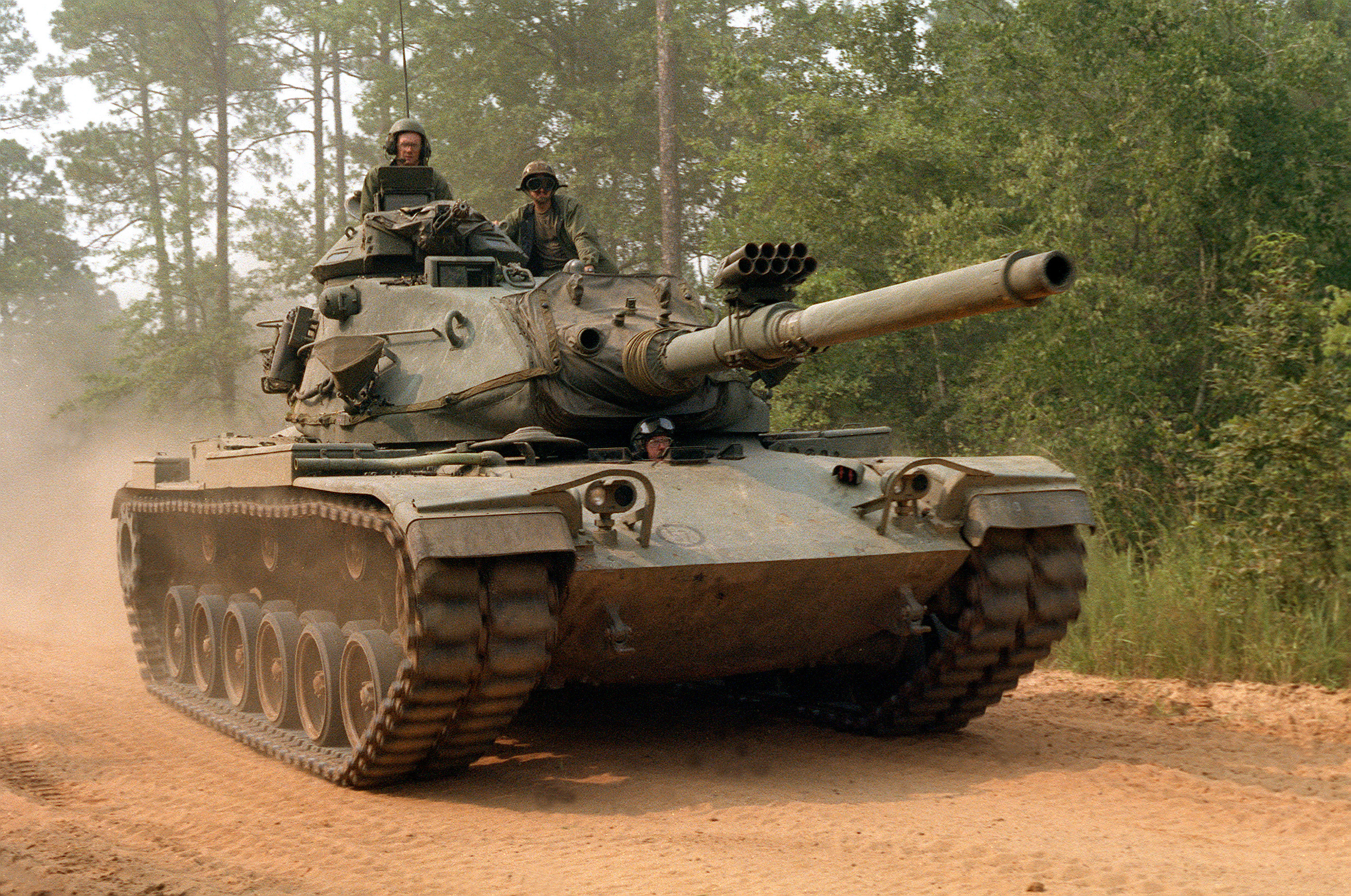
A Georgia National Guard M60A3 tank at Fort Stewart in July 1983

The M60A3 tank was 31 feet (9.4 m) long, weighed 57.3 tonnes (56.4 long tons; 63.2 short tons) fully loaded, and could reach speeds of 45 miles per hour (72 km/h) with a range of nearly 300 miles (480 km). It had a 7.62-millimetre (0.300 in) machine gun, 12.7-millimetre (0.50 in) anti-aircraft gun, and 105-millimetre (4.1 in) cannon; these weapons systems at the San Diego armory were all unloaded.

== Theft and destruction ==
On the evening of May 17, the armory's gates were unsecured because personnel were working late. Nelson was uncontested at 6:30 p.m. when he drove his Chevrolet van onto the property. The shirtless and disheveled man then broke the padlocks on three different tanks before starting an M60A3. Nelson crashed through the armory's gate at approximately 6:45 p.m.

Nelson's route

Nelson drove the tank through residential Kearny Mesa, San Diego neighborhoods, where residents described the destruction as intentional: "He didn't go down the center of the street, [...] It seems he just wanted to get the utilities and cause as much as damage without hurting people." Over a distance of six miles (9.7 km), he struck bridges, a bus bench, fire hydrants, traffic lights, 40 cars—crushing some down to a height of 2 1/2 feet (0.76 m), and utility poles, leaving some 5100 households without electricity. Nelson inflicted no injuries during his 25-minute rampage.

The San Diego Police Department (SDPD) learned of the incident at 6:46 p.m. when a detective reported that he was following Nelson. SDPD units headed to intercept the tank, and California State Route 163 (SR 163) was closed. An SDPD captain said of Nelson's tank skills: "He obviously knew what he was doing. He was working that tank pretty good."

== End of rampage ==
After driving onto SR 163, Nelson crashed the tank into a three-foot (0.91 m) traffic barrier at 32.793958°N 117.158426°W, near Sharp Memorial Hospital. The impact dislodged one of the tank's tracks. Four SDPD officers boarded the tank and opened the hatch (which was in "combat lockdown") with bolt cutters. Nelson refused to surrender and attempted to dislodge the police by spinning the tank.

Having no armament capable of penetrating the armor, and unsure whether Nelson was armed, police shot him. Two days after the incident, the Los Angeles Times reported that Nelson was shot in the right shoulder, and The New York Times said he was alive when pulled from the tank; 18 days after the event, People published that Nelson had been shot in the left shoulder, killing him immediately. Sharp Memorial later reported that Nelson died of "gunshot wounds" (without disclosing how many times he was shot), and the San Diego coroner's office said that Nelson "smelled of alcohol"—ultimately determining his blood alcohol content was double the legal limit for driving.

== Aftermath ==
Nelson's friends criticized the shooting, saying police should have used tear gas or crisis negotiation. SDPD captain Tom Hall defended the decision, saying "[t]he bottom line was, we had to stop this guy." The district attorney of San Diego County later ruled the shooting was justified because, had he freed the tank, Nelson could have injured or killed people.

For legal culpability, the California Guard was found to be negligent and therefore responsible. The state paid out a total of US$149,201 (equivalent to $306,285 in 2025): $10,000 (equivalent to $20,528 in 2025) to Pacific Bell, $12,500 (equivalent to $25,660 in 2025) to the city of San Diego, $40,965.69 (equivalent to $84,096 in 2025) to San Diego Gas & Electric, and the rest to individual citizens (mostly for damage to vehicles).

In the following years, the uncertainty of Nelson's motives led to commentators projecting their theories onto his actions: "a saga about the middle class under siege; a fable about the emasculation of American men; a warning about what happens when ex-servicemen, lacking foreign enemies and domestic opportunities, bring the war home."

=== National Guard ===
Immediately afterwards, the National Guard planned to send two additional tanks to SR 163 to help maneuver the disabled tank onto a flatbed truck.

The Guard confirmed that vehicles entering the armory grounds were not checked (despite heightened security after the recent Oklahoma City bombing). Major Ed Gale told the media that Nelson apparently broke an exterior lock on the tank to gain access, and that it was the first tank theft at the armory. By the next day, the batteries had been removed from 28 more National Guard tanks in Southern California, and the mayor of San Diego, Susan Golding, had written to the governor of California, Pete Wilson, demanding an investigation into the armory's security.

By November 1996, the Guard had improved security and awareness at its armories and moved all its tanks to either Fort Irwin or Camp Roberts.

== See also ==
- 1974 White House helicopter incident – Theft and flight of military aircraft
- 1973 Fort Knox Tank Rampage
- 1982 Mannheim attack – 1982 road attack in Germany
- 1993 Perth tank rampage – 1993 tank rampage
- 1998 Alma rampage – Murder and vehicle attack on town
- 2007 Sydney tank rampage
- 2008 Jerusalem bulldozer attack – Vehicle-ramming attack in Jerusalem
- 2018 Richmond Armored Vehicle Chase
- Craig D. Button – US Air Force pilot who disappeared and crashed his A-10 aircraft (1964–1997)
- Harry's War (1981 film) – US comedy-drama film
- Marvin Heemeyer – American known for bulldozer rampage (1951–2004)
- Tank (film) – 1984 film by Marvin J. Chomsky
