= 1998 Alma rampage =

Murder and vehicle attack on town

- Date: February 26–27, 1998
- Time: 5:30 p.m. – 1 a.m. (MST)
- Location: Alma, Colorado, US
- Target: Alma, Colorado; Fire station; Post office; Town hall; Water treatment
- Perpetrator: Thomas Leask
- Deaths: Willie Morrison
- Property damage: US$100,000 (eq. $198,000 in 2025)
- Convictions: Pled guilty × 13 charges
- Sentence: Life + 27 years

The 1998 Alma rampage was a murder and vehicle-ramming attack in the small Colorado town on February 26 and 27, perpetrated by Thomas Leask.

== Background ==
Alma, Colorado is a town, 65 miles (105 km) southwest of Denver, at an elevation of 10,578 feet (3,224 m). In 1995, the Federal Bureau of Investigation designated Alma the safest town in the United States, with a crime rate of zero percent. Willie Morrison (born 1957/1958) was the mayor from April 1994 – March 1995, and still worked for the town until the third week of February 1998, when he and several town council members resigned in protest of a newly hired marshal. The contemporary population of Alma was 150 people.

Thomas Leask (born 1947/1948) drove a snowplow part-time and was a native of Alma. By early 1998, he had begun living in a backyard shack and stockpiling wood in his house. He had reportedly been fighting with municipal authorities since being forced onto the town's water supply network during Morrison's tenure as mayor.

== Attack ==
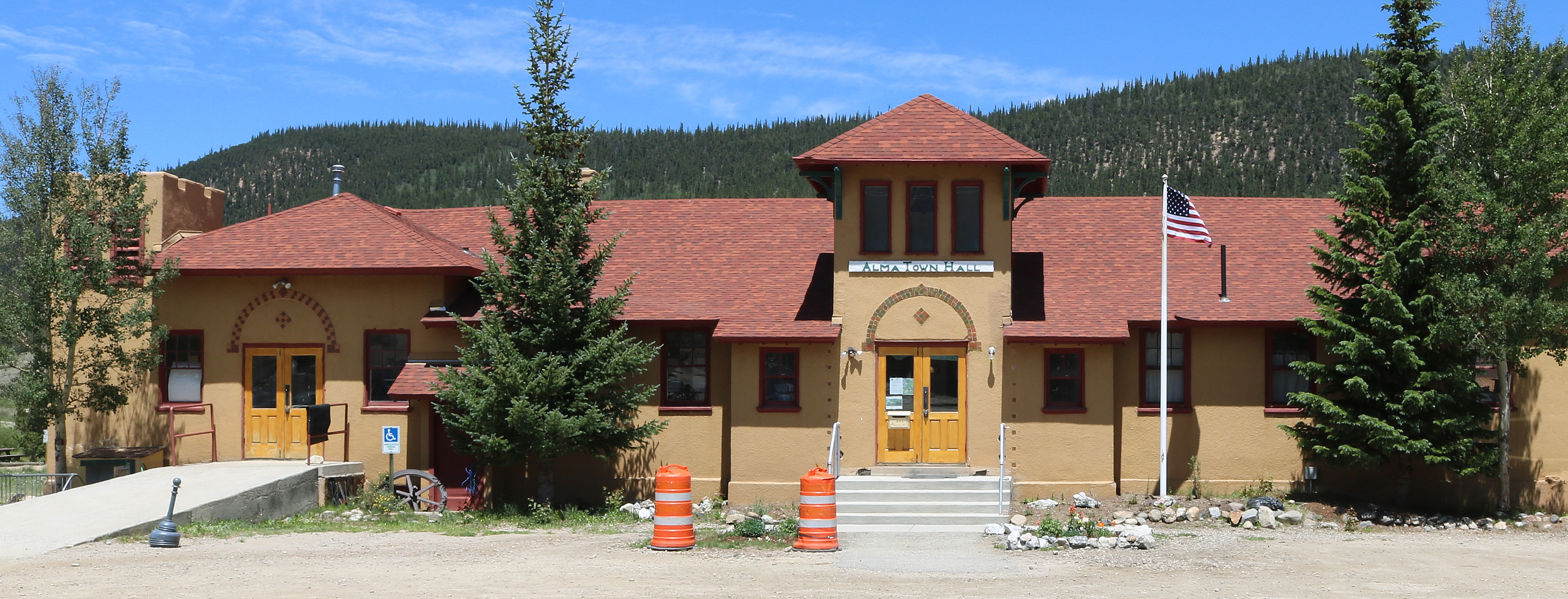
Alma town hall in July 2020

At around 5:30 p.m. on February 26, 1998, Leask shot and killed Willie Morrison in the Alma town hall, leaving behind six Molotov cocktails. He then stole a town-owned front-end loader, and drove it into the local water treatment plant, disabling the town's water supply, leading to the loss of thousands of gallons of water, which resulted in sheets of ice on the Alma streets. Afterwards, Leask took the military-surplus heavy equipment and rammed Alma's town hall, fire department, and post office, leaving holes that measured 10 by 15 feet (3.0 by 4.6 m) and disrupting telephone service.

At around 1 a.m., having already set his house on fire, Leask was arrested in a nearby grove, armed with a .45-caliber pistol and a 30.06 rifle.

== Aftermath ==
The destruction in Alma required Colorado State Highway 9 to be closed down for several hours. Repairing the damage in town was estimated to cost at least US$100,000 (equivalent to about $198,000 in 2025), a prohibitive amount for Alma's municipal finances. Locals suspected Leask's motive could have been the legally-imposed connection to municipal water, Morrison's alleged outing of Leask as a member of Alcoholics Anonymous, or a prohibition of Leask's outhouse; Leask told investigators from the Park County, Colorado sheriff's office that he had been "directed by God [sic]."

On February 27, Leask was being held pending investigation on charges on first-degree arson, criminal mischief, and first-degree murder, to which he said in court, "I plead guilty to all of it". He was assigned a public defender against his wishes, and held without bail. On March 9, Leask was formally charged with 13 criminal counts, including first-degree arson, first-degree burglary, and first-degree murder.

Leask's neighbor, David Rowe, was charged with accessory to murder for helping Leask evade sheriff's deputies, a felony charge with a maximum sentence of life imprisonment. Rowe was instead sentenced to twelve days in jail on the misdemeanor charge of obstructing justice.

While in Park County pre-trial detention, Leask stabbed himself in the chest with improvised sharpened weapons; he was treated and held for psychiatric evaluation in the Colorado Mental Health Institute at Pueblo. In October 1998, Leask was found mentally incompetent to stand trial; the following spring he was found competent by two state physicians. In June 2000, Leask pled guilty to 13 charges, and was sentenced to life imprisonment plus 27 years. As of June 2004, he was institutionalized in a Colorado psychiatric hospital.

== See also ==
- 1995 San Diego tank rampage – Destruction wrought by stolen tank
- List of vehicle-ramming attacks
