= Separation (United States military) =

Status of U.S. military personnel

In the United States Armed Forces, separation means that a person is leaving active duty but not necessarily the service entirely. Separation typically occurs when someone reaches the date of their Expiration of Term of Service and are released from active duty, but still must complete their military reserve obligations. Upon separation, they receive Department of Defense Form 214, Certificate of Release or Discharge from Active Duty (DD 214), which verifies their military service.

Former service members must present DD 214 to receive Veterans Administration benefits. A veteran or next of kin may request a copy of the DD 214 form by going to National Personnel Records Center's website.

When service members complete their full military obligation, they are discharged and receive a formal certificate of discharge, usually an honorable discharge.
