= 1993 Perth tank rampage =

1993 tank rampage

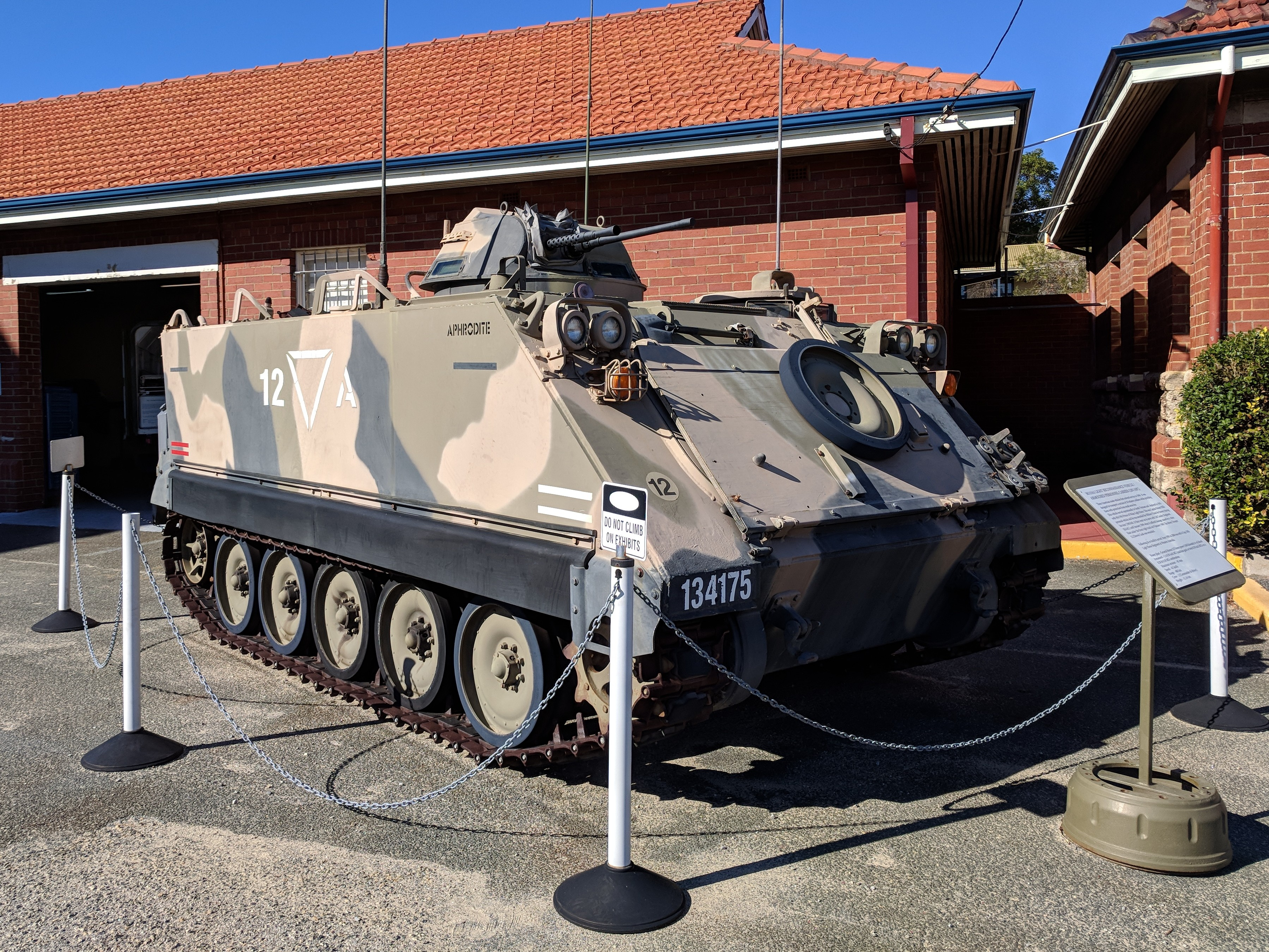
- A former Australian Army M113 similar to the one used in the 1993 rampage
- Date: 27 April 1993
- Time: 4:40 am – 6:15 am
- Duration: 95 minutes
- Location: Perth, Western Australia; 31°57′23″S 115°49′44″E
- Type: Theft
- Target: Wembley police station; Western Australia Police headquarters; Criminal Investigation Branch headquarters; Law courts
- Participants: Gary Alan Hayes
- Outcome: Damages to police and government buildings, 7 police vehicles, 5 private vehicles, and a bus stop.
- Charges: 19 counts of criminal damage, burglary and assault of police officers
- Awards: Commissioner's Certificate of Merit awarded to constables D. Shaw, A.J. Power and Senior Constable D Morgan

The 1993 Perth tank rampage refers to an event in the early hours of 27 April 1993, when 27-year-old Gary Alan Hayes stole an armoured personnel carrier (APC) – referred to in the media as a tank – from Irwin Barracks and drove it through the Perth CBD, ramming police targets and government buildings. It is the first of only two events of this kind in Australia, the second happening in Sydney in 2007.

== Background and rampage ==
Hayes had a history of mental health issues, and previous encounters with the police over criminal behaviour, including charges of breaking and entering a delicatessen in 1987, stealing A$78,000, equivalent to A$232,000 in 2022, worth of counter-terrorist equipment from the Special Air Service Regiment barracks in November 1992, and illegal possession of a firearm in April 1993. In 1987 he was forcibly admitted to the maximum-security wing of Graylands Hospital due to paranoid delusions, and treated for schizophrenia.

On the morning of 27 April, Hayes stole an Australian Army M113 APC (without ammunition) from Irwin Barracks. Some reports have alleged police abuse and harassment as the motive for his behaviour. Hayes drove the APC through a fence and into the side of the Wembley police station at 4:40 am. He then rammed a police van and drove towards the police headquarters in the CBD, where he smashed through the security gates and rammed six police vehicles, a motorcycle, and several private vehicles. He then caused damage to the Western Australia Police Criminal Investigation Branch building before circling Parliament House, where police negotiators failed in efforts to get him to surrender. Three special forces officers climbed onto the vehicle and dropped a tear gas canister into it, after which he was arrested following a struggle. Media at the time commented on his use of turning indicators and stopping at a red traffic signal.

== Aftermath ==
The media coverage treated the event as a surreal and somewhat humorous event. When queried as to the ease with which the vehicle had been stolen, Brigadier Terry Nolan stated that "If you'd have asked me this yesterday I would have said it's not easy to do it, but the evidence of this morning would indicate that it's perhaps easier than I would have thought."

In court Hayes claimed his actions were retaliation against the police for three attempts to kill him. His defence was later rejected and he was sentenced to four and a half years in Casuarina Prison with the possibility of parole after 17 months. He was diagnosed with paranoid schizophrenia. Hayes died in 2017.

== See also ==
- 1995 San Diego tank rampage
