= The Heroes (1989 miniseries) =

- Based on: The Heroes by Ronald McKie
- Screenplay by: Peter Yeldham
- Directed by: Donald Crombie
- Starring: Paul Rhys; John Bach; John Hargreaves
- Theme music composer: Peter Best
- Countries of origin: Australia; United Kingdom
- Original language: English
- No. of episodes: 2

Production
- Executive producers: Graham Benson; Valerie Hardy
- Producer: Anthony Buckley
- Running time: 2 x 2 hours
- Production companies: TVS Films; Channel Ten Productions
- Budget: A$5.9 million

Original release
- Network: ITV
- Release: 2 April – 3 April 1989
- Network: Channel Ten
- Release: 27 August – 28 August 1989

Related
- Heroes II: The Return

The Heroes is a 1989 British/Australian mini-series on Operation Jaywick, a World War II special forces raid on Japanese shipping in Singapore harbour by the Australian Z Special Unit, based on Ronald McKie's 1960 book The Heroes.

== Plot ==
Ivan Lyon, a British Army officer who was promoted to major and decorated for bravery, planned a mission using a former fishing vessel to transport a selected team of commandos into Singapore Harbour to attack Japanese warships.

When Lyon receives the awful news that his wife and young son have been killed on board a ship bombed by the Japanese, his superiors feel that he is unhinged and refuse to consider his foolhardy plan. He eventually wins them over and the dangerous mission is put into action. "The Heroes" tells the absorbing true story of Operation Jaywick.

== Part One ==
When the Japanese invade Singapore, Captain Ivan Lyon formerly of the Gordon Highlanders and currently working for the SOE flees to Sumatra with civilian evacuees. On the way Lyon meets with Bill Reynolds, the captain of the battered old Japanese fishing boat the Kofuku Maru and they sail to Ceylon. Returning to Australia, Lyon wanting to come up with a way to hit back at the Japanese who have captured his wife and son, concocts a plan to attack enemy shipping in Singapore harbour. Meanwhile, the newly formed Z Special Force conducts a special operation to test techniques that could be utilised against Japanese shipping. Led by Captain Sam Carey and Lieutenant Ted Carse the commandos paddle in canoes into Townsville harbour, planting explosives on the docked vessels. Lyon now with proof of the effectiveness of this method meets with Colonel Mott of the SRD to help promote his plan codenamed Operation Jaywick. Initially Lyon and Mott receive resistance from their superior officers but eventually are given the greenlight to launch the attack using the Kofuku Maru, now renamed the MV Krait. Lyon enlists Carse and two other officers, Donald Davidison and Bob Page to lead the mission. Along with the fishing boats crew, Lyon's batman, a cook and a radio operator, Davidson also selects five navy commandos to conduct the actual canoe operations. The Krait leaves Exmouth Gulf on its long journey to Singapore when it immediately breaks down, after returning to Exmouth Gulf and a patch up repair Lyon's force eventually begins its long and hazardous journey.

== Part Two ==
With the commandos disguised as native fishermen, the Krait sails northwards towards Borneo. The trip is far from uneventful as the Krait struggles against strong tides in the Lombok Straight and Carse is sick. Reaching within striking distance Lyon leads the canoeists and they destroy many Japanese merchant vessels docked at Singapore before making their escape by canoe. After initially missing their rendezvous, Lyon's party are finally picked up by the Krait. On the journey back the men on the Krait must endure a nerve-wracking run in with a Japanese destroyer, again in the Lombok Straight, before finally entering Exmouth Gulf to a heroic welcome.

== Cast ==
- Paul Rhys as Ivan Lyon – Mission Commander
- John Bach as Donald Davidson – Raid Commander
- John Hargreaves as Ted Carse – Ship's Navigator & Captain
- Bill Kerr as Paddy McDowell – Ship's Engineer
- Jason Donovan as 'Happy' Houston – Navy Commando
- Cameron Daddo as Joey Jones – Navy Commando
- Christopher Morsley as Robert Page – Medical Officer
- Timothy Lyn as 'Taffy' Morris – Medical Orderly
- Gerry Skilton as Corporal Andy Crilley – Ship's Cook
- David Wenham as 'Horrie' Young – Radio Operator
- Jeff Truman as 'Cobber' Cain – Ship's Gunner
- Tim Robertson as Colonel Mott
- John Ewart as Bill Reynolds
- John Bonney as Rear Admiral
- Lorna Lesley as Pat Carse
- Briony Behets as Alice
- Gus Mercurio as Captain Hawes

== Production ==
The mini series was developed for Channel Ten by Glenn Darlington, writer and producer and principal of Menwood Television Pty Ltd. Darlington acquired the television rights to the book 'The Heroes' by Ronald McKie with his permission that the story remain an authentic account of events of the Operation Jaywick raid. Darlington developed the synopsis interviewing key survivors of Operation Jaywick. He sold the rights to Network Ten Australia and Television South of the UK. An early draft of the script included a fictitious love story included at the insistence of British investors but this was later cut. George Whaley was originally attached to direct but pulled out in order to do a proposed mini series of My Brother Jack.

Filming was done at Homebush, Sydney, in and around Cairns, and at Mission Beach. The shoot took eleven weeks with two weeks rehearsal.

== Reception ==
The mini-series was enormously successful in the UK and Australia. In the UK it was seen by over 15 million people with an average audience share of 61% and was the highest rating mini-series on ITV at that time. It rated well in Australia despite the rival Channel Seven screening The Highest Honor (1982), which dealt with the same story, beforehand as a spoiler. Channel Seven funded the sequel, Heroes II: The Return, which dealt with Operation Rimau.

In 1991 the mini-series was cut down to 90 minute TV movie.
