= Heroes II: The Return =

- Screenplay by: Peter Yeldham
- Directed by: Donald Crombie
- Theme music composer: Peter Best
- Countries of origin: Australia; United Kingdom
- Original language: English
- No. of episodes: 2

Production
- Executive producer: Graham Benson
- Producer: Anthony Buckley
- Running time: 101 minutes (including adverts)
- Production companies: TVS Films; Telso Productions
- Budget: $6.5 million

Original release
- Network: ITV
- Release: 15 December – 16 December 1991
- Network: Network 10
- Release: 27 April – 4 May 1992

Related
- The Heroes

Heroes II: the Return is a 1991 British/Australian miniseries about Operation Rimau during World War II. It was a sequel to the 1989 mini-series The Heroes.

== Plot ==
=== Part One ===
After the success of Operation Jaywick, Ivan Lyon of Z Special Force proposes a second raid on Singapore harbour named Operation Rimau again aimed at sinking enemy shipping. Lyon enlists Donald Davidson and Bob Page and nineteen Z Force commandos but finds little faith in Colonel Mott, who backed Jaywick vigorously while other senior officers didn't. When Lyon's original plan is scuppered it looks like it's the end for Rimau, but Lyon receives the unlikely support of Lord Mountbatten who wants to show the dominant American's that Commonwealth forces are still fighting the Japanese too. With Mountbatten overriding Mott, Lyon's force proceed by submarine until they capture a native fishing boat then make a base on Merapas Island. After capturing a vessel and leaving four men to guard their supplies, Lyon sets sail for Singapore disguised as Malay fishermen. While everything is seemingly going well their cover is blown merely miles from their target, Lyon evacuates the fishing boat and sends his force back in canoes. While the majority of crew paddle back towards their rendezvous, Lyon along with five Z Special commandos raid Singapore Harbour in their canoes. Days later when a submarine returns to Merapas to pick up the Z Force men they find the island deserted with little sign of where they've gone.

=== Part Two ===
The war has ended and Army Intelligence officer Captain Ellis is approached to investigate the disappearance of the twenty three Z Special commandos sent on Operation Rimau. Ellis conducts his investigation, questioning captured Japanese officers and men. Piece by piece Ellis learns that Lyon's men were tracked down on Merapas and fled to nearby islands in a bid to hide out until the submarine returned for them. Secret documents from Mountbatten's headquarters reveal to Ellis that a radio distress message sent by Lyon was received by General MacArthur's headquarters but ignored for weeks. Ultimately whilst many were killed, including Lyon and Davidson, ten were captured and taken to Changi Prison to await trial for perfidy. Ellis uncovers Japaneses documents detailing the trial and subsequent executions which in turn leads him to the prisoners Japanese translator, Hiroyuki Furuta. Under pressure from Ellis, Feruta finally admits that the ten prisoners weren't given a fair trial and far from being executed in an honorific manner as documented they were herded into a field and viciously beheaded. Ellis takes his evidence to his superior officers but is told those guilty of war crimes will not be prosecuted under the orders of General MacArthur. So with nothing more left for him to do, Ellis informs the relatives of the Rimau commandos of their fate.

== Cast ==
- Nathaniel Parker as Ivan Lyon
- Christopher Morsley as Robert Page
- John Bach as Lt. Cmdr. Donald 'Davo' Davidson
- Simon Burke as Capt. Ellis
- Ken Teraizumi as Hiroyuki Furuta
- Mark Lewis Jones as Royal Marine Maj. Reggie Ingleton
- Ian Bolt as Lt Bobby Ross
- Anne-Louise Lambert as Nancy Davidson
- Miranda Otto as Roma Page
- Craig McLachlan as Lt. Walter Carey
- Troy Willats as Able Seaman Andrew 'Happy' Huston
- Wayne Scott Kermond as Able Seaman Frederick 'Boof' Marsh
- Kelly Dingwall as Able Seaman Walter 'Poppa' Falls
- John O'Hare as Cpl. Fletcher
- Scott McGregor as Cpl. Claire Stewart
- Kate Sheil as Roma's Mother
- Kit Taylor as Roma's Father
- Jonathan Sweet as Mackenzie

== Production ==
Channel Ten were not interested in making a sequel to The Heroes but Channel Seven were. Robert McKie's book had been the source for the first mini-series but only the rights to the section of it which dealt with Operation Jaywick had been bought. Peter Yeldham did a great deal of original research, helped by Lee Robinson who had previously made a film on the same story, The Highest Honor (1982).

Several of the original cast elected not to return, including Paul Rhys and Jason Donovan, but Christopher Morley, John Bach and Wayne Scott Kermond did. Filming commenced 27 April 1991 and took place in Queensland and at Otford, south of Sydney. Buckley says the UK partners, who had been supportive on The Heroes, were far more interfering on the sequel.

== Reception ==
The sequel was popular though it did not rate as well as The Heroes.
