= Operation Scorpion (World War Two) =

Allied World War II aborted special operation in New Guinea

Operation Scorpion was a proposed operation in World War II by Australia's Z Special Unit.

It was to be the first operation by Z Special Unit. Australian soldiers were to infiltrate the Japanese-controlled port at Rabaul in New Britain. The mission led to a practice raid on Townsville Harbour. The actual mission was called off but elements were used in the famous Operation Jaywick.

== Origins of the Plan ==
The plan was devised by Lieutenant Samuel Warren Carey, a Z Special Unit officer based at Z Experimental Station, Cairns, Queensland who had extensive experience of Papua New Guinea. In January 1943 he approached General Thomas Blamey proposing a raid on Rabaul.

The raid would work as follows:

- Use one submarine, with a small group of commandos on board.
- The commandos would be dropped 16 kilometres off Rabaul.
- The commandos would then use their Hoehn military folboats (collapsible kayaks, or folding boats) to travel into the harbour and attach limpet mines to as many enemy ships as possible.
- They would then retreat to a volcano section on Vulcan Island roughly 6 kilometres south of Rabaul, where they would hide out until they could safely rendezvous with the submarine.

Blamey authorised the operation, and issued Carey a letter of authority to perform whatever actions he deemed necessary during the planning of the proposed operation. Training began in March 1943 and involved the selection of the team and intense training.

== Townsville Raid ==
Soldiers trained for this with a secret raid on Townsville Harbour on 19 June 1943

Carey and a team of nine men, including Bob Page, left a train at a river crossing just north of Townsville on 19 June 1943. They carried 45 sand filled limpet mines and dehydrated food for three days. They had no fuses and the mines could not be detonated.

It took them 30 hours to reach Magnetic Island. They left their base at Magnetic Island on 22 June and paddled by folboat through to Townsville Harbour. Despite the mouth of the harbour being heavily mined they managed to avoid these dangers.

Dummy limpet mines were attached to fifteen ships, including two destroyers, with three limpet mines on each.

The men rowed into Ross Creek, dismantled and hid their folboats, then travelled to Townsville.

The limpets were discovered around 10:00 am the next morning. Panic ensued and it was felt that the mines were real.

Carey was arrested, and only released on producing General Blamey's letter. The navy decided not to pursue legal action on the undertaking that Carey left Z Special Unit.

== Result of Mission ==
Operation Scorpion was scrapped due to lack of available submarine transport and the fact that General MacArthur's island hopping strategy involved by-passing Rabaul. However lessons learned from the raid proved useful in planning Operation Jaywick and Operation Rimau. Carey's younger brother would be captured and executed in the latter.
