= The Highest Honour =

- Theatrical release poster
- Directed by: Peter Maxwell; Seiji Maruyama
- Written by: Lee Robinson; Katsuya Susaki
- Based on: book by Yuzuru Shinozaki
- Produced by: Lee Robinson executive John McCallum
- Starring: John Howard; Steve Bisley
- Cinematography: John McLean
- Music by: Eric Jupp
- Production company: Southern International Films
- Distributed by: Seven Network (AUS); Toho (Japan)
- Release dates: 15 May 1982 (Japan); 9 August 1989 (Australian TV)
- Running time: 96 mins(US); 108 mins (AUS); 143 mins (Japan)
- Countries: Australia; Japan
- Languages: English; Japanese
- Budget: over A$5 million

The Highest Honour is a 1982 Australian/Japanese co-production about Operation Jaywick and Operation Rimau by Z Special Unit during World War II.

The same story inspired the TV mini-series Heroes (1988) and Heroes II: The Return (1991).

== Plot ==
During World War II, a team of Australian soldiers from Z Special Unit, including Ivan Lyon and Robert Page, successfully lead an expedition to destroy ships in Singapore harbour, Operation Jaywick. An attempt to duplicate this success, Operation Rimau, ends in disaster, with the team either killed or captured. These soldiers are interrogated by the Japanese in Singapore, with Page forming a friendship with Minoru Tamiya. Eventually all the Australians are convicted of war crimes and executed.

== Cast ==
- John Howard as Capt. Robert Page
- Atsuo Nakamura as Minoru Tamiya
- Stuart Wilson as Lt. Col. Ivan Lyon
- Steve Bisley as A.B. W.G. Falls
- Michael Aitkens as Major R.M. Ingleton
- George Mallaby as Lt. Cmdr. Don Davidson
- Tony Bonner as Lt. W.G. Carey
- John Ley as Lt. A.I. Sargent
- Harold Hopkins as Cpl. C.M. Stewart
- Gary Waddell as Cpl. R.B. Fletcher
- Slim DeGrey as Leading Stoker J.P. McDowell
- Alan Cassell as Lt. Ted Carse
- Mark Hembrow as Able Seaman F.W. Marsh
- Vincent Ball as Lt. Cmdr. Hubert Marsham
- Craig Ballard as Lt. B. Raymond
- James Belton as Lt. H.R. Ross
- Warren Coleman as Leading Seaman K.P. Cain
- Diane Craig as Mrs. Page
- George Duff as Cpl. A.G. Campbell
- Tim Elston as Sgt. D.P. Gooley
- Takuya Fujioka as Matsumoto
- Ken Goodlet as Bill Reynolds
- John Griffiths as Sgt. C.B. Cameron
- Riki Harada as Sgt. Imai
- Michael Harrs as Lt Cpl. J.T. Hardy
- Noel Hodda as Able Seaman M.M. Berryman
- Andrew Inglis as Able Seaman A.M. Jones
- Kin'ya Kitaōji as Tachibana
- Hôsei Komatsu as Yabe
- Hitomi Kuroki as Nurse Keiko Tsumura
- Veronica Lang as Mrs. Lyon
- Hu Yin Mong as Lu Ran Shi
- Yû Numazaki as Capt. Nomura
- Neil Redfern as WO2 A. Warren
- Jiro Sakagami as Kimura
- Taro Shigaki as Hayakawa
- Trevor Sommers as Sub. Lt. J.G. Riggs
- Mizuho Suzuki as Maj. Gen. Kawamura
- Jonathan Sweet as Cpl. A. Crilley
- Hajime Tawara as Sgt. Maj. Omori

== Production ==
Producers John McCallum and Lee Robinson had previously made a film about Z Special Unit, Attack Force Z (1981). Robinson said he was approached to make the film by a member of the Australian embassy in Tokyo in 1980. He says the official asked him if he was interested in making a movie about Jaywick and Rimau with a Japanese company. Robinson says he spent a year researching the story in Japanese and Australian archives.

The film was originally shot under the title of Southern Cross. Production took place in 1982. It was financed by two dozen Australian businessmen and a Japanese production company, Shinihon Eija, who contributed $1.5 million in marketing and production costs.

There were two versions of the film – Australian and Japanese. Robinson later said the two versions were intrinsically the same but the emphasis in the Japanese film was more towards the Japanese actors and vice versa.

Robinson later said that "the film is a human story of how a friendship can develop among enemies and how human spirit rises above the atrocities of war. It is an anti-war film set in a period remembered for horrendous slayings of civilians."

== Release ==
The film was never released theatrically in Australia but did screen as a TV mini-series in 1989. It did obtain a theatrical release in the US and UK and McCallum says the film sold widely to television. It was also known as Heroes of the Krait and Minami Jujisei.

The widow of Bob Page and survivors of Z Force were furious with the film, claiming it was far too complimentary to the Japanese. Robinson admitted the film was "50 percent fiction" and that "there is no doubt that the whole picture is designed as an apology, but with facts as dramatic as these, why play around with it? What gives the film the impact is the constant reminder that this is true."

Robinson admitted there was an occasion when the Japanese producers wanted the prison set to have pillows and sheets on the bed to make them look nicer, but he refused. A scene where a Japanese officer comes to Australia ten years after the war to make peace with one of the widows, Roma Greemish, was cut at the request of Ms Greemish.

McCallum later said that "Stuart Wilson was very good in" the film but:

It got bogged down with too much Japanese dialogue, because they were co-producing, and put up half the money. They insisted on a lot of Japanese. I said, 'You're the villains in this, you beheaded the Australians.' But they thought they'd make a huge amount of money out of it; the man behind the film company was a millionaire. He took us up there, Robinson and myself and some of the actors, and we had a great jamboree of a week in Tokyo, where he had a huge launch of the damn thing in a huge cinema. He said 'We're releasing it tomorrow all over Japan. We expect to make three million.' I think they lost three million.

In 1982 Thomas Keneally was reported as working on a script for another film based on Operation Rimau called Rimau for the South Australian Film Corporation to be made for $1 million, but no film eventuated.
