= Operation Binatang =

Allied World War II special operation in Java

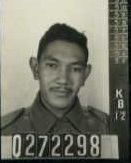
John Charles Buxton

Operation Binatang was an Australian covert operation conducted by the Services Reconnaissance Department (SRD) during World War II. An agent of Z Special Unit was to be landed on the north coast of Java to recruit more men who would give active assistance to the allied cause. The operation was conceived in January 1944 but owing to the shortage of available submarines and the priority of Operation Hornbill it was delayed. When Hornbill was aborted arrangements were made for the mission to commence in February 1945.

The agent chosen was Q272298 Private John Charles Buxton of “Z” Special Unit. Buxton was born in Semarang to an English father and Javanese mother and escaped to Australia from Japanese occupied Java in 1943 aboard a lugger. As he was familiar with the area, Buxton would probably have more success than Operation Tiger, which was a series of operations conducted by the Netherlands East Indies Forces Intelligence Service (NEIFIS), almost all ended in disaster.

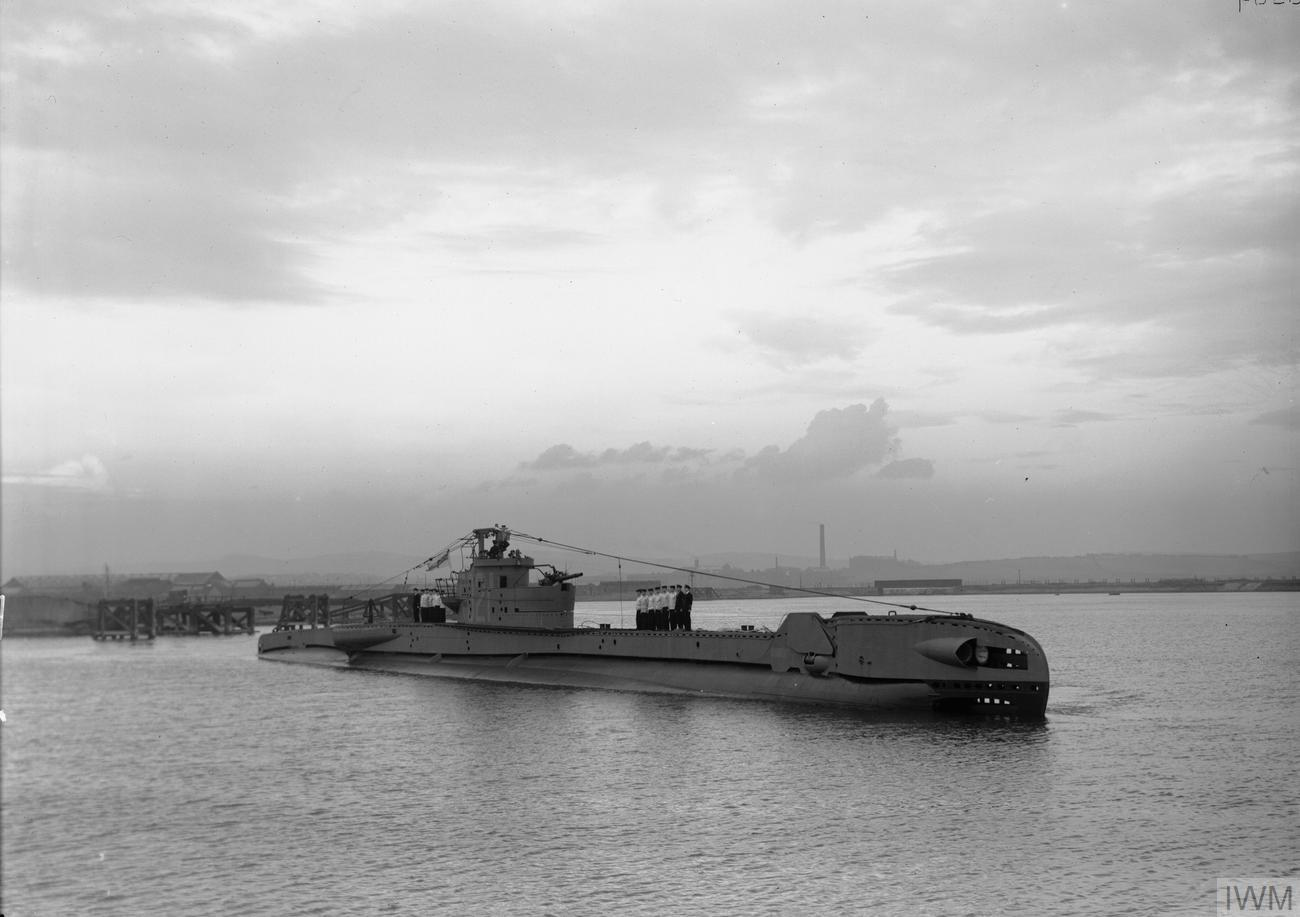
HMS Telemachus

The insertion into Japanese occupied Java was to be carried out on 24 February 1945 along the coast near Ujung Piring (Cape Piring) not far from the town of Jepara and approximately 80 km north east of Semarang. HMS Telemachus arrived at the location but owing to bad weather after 3 days Lt Cdr W D A King RN abandoned the landing and proceeded with the patrol before returning to Fremantle via Darwin where Buxton was disembarked on 30 March 1945.

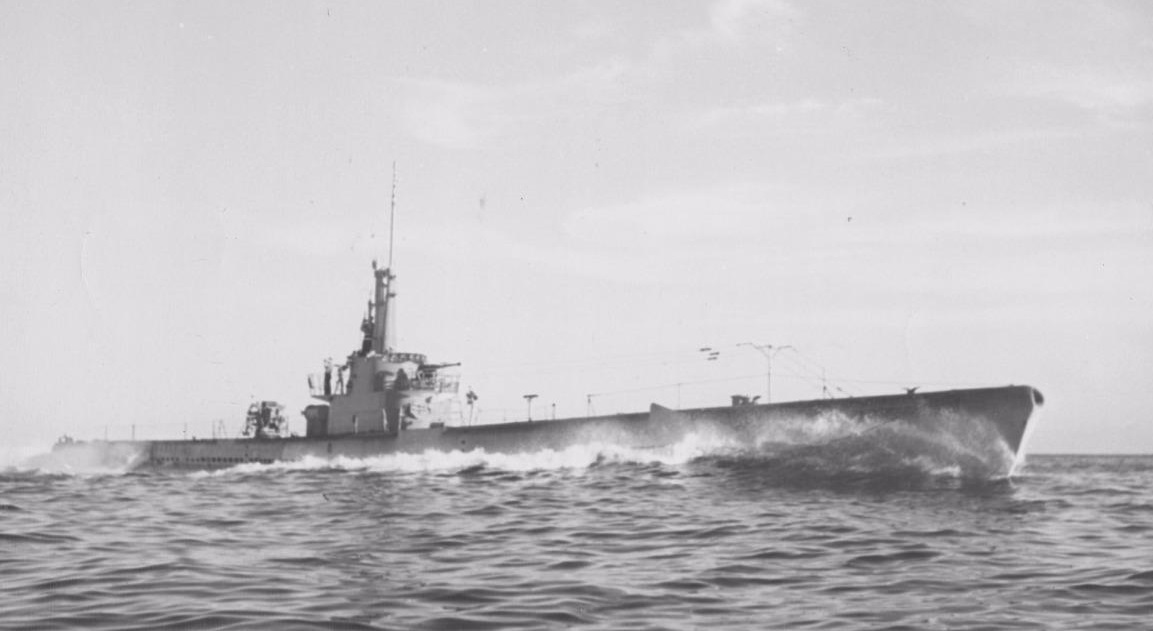
USS Blueback ss326

On 12 May 1945 Buxton left Fremantle aboard USS Blueback (Lt Cdr M K Clementson USN). He was successfully inserted at Cape Piring on 19 May 1945 and after obtaining identity documents made his way to Semarang. Buxton was able to recruit a group of local men who were willing to help the allies and then the Japanese surrendered. He made contact with Lt Col van der Post and the newly arrived allies in Batavia and was then returned to Australia via Singapore.

After the war Buxton left the army and joined the RAAF but because he could not prove his British nationality he was ordered to leave Australia. In 1949 he gained permission to enter New Caledonia and join the French Foreign Legion. He was assigned to the 3rd Foreign Infantry Regiment, amphibious division. In May 1954 he was wounded at the Battle of Dien Bien Phu and died three weeks later.

== Bibliography ==
- White, Michael (2015). Australian Submarines A History. Vol. 2 (2nd ed.). St Kilda: Australian Teachers of Media. pp. 1302, 1315. ISBN 9781876467265.
- "[The Official History of the Operations and Administration of] Special Operations - Australia [(SOA), also known as the Inter-Allied Services Department (ISD) and Services Reconnaissance Department (SRD)] Volume 2 - Operations - copy no 1 [for Director, Military Intelligence (DMI), Headquarters (HQ), Australian Military Forces (AMF), Melbourne] Part 1 page 72". National Archives of Australia. pp. 177–179.
