= Watch the Birdies (TV series) =

1966 British television thriller series

- Written by: Peter Yeldham
- Directed by: Douglas Camfield
- Starring: Nicholas Courtney; Wanda Ventham; Karin Fernald; Michael Brennan; John Junkin
- Country of origin: United Kingdom
- Original language: English
- No. of series: 1
- No. of episodes: 5

Production
- Producer: Alan Bromly
- Running time: 25m per episode
- Production company: BBC

Original release
- Network: BBC
- Release: 19 June – 17 July 1966

Watch the Birdies is a 1966 British television mini-series based on a screenplay by Peter Yeldham that aired on the BBC. The series was a five-part thriller series about a detective who gets involved in the London underworld through investigation of the world of fashion photography. All five episodes were wiped and are believed to be lost.

Rolf von Sydow directed in 1969 a West German remake of it named Bitte recht freundlich, es wird geschossen.

== Cast ==
- Nicholas Courtney as Bill Page
- Wanda Ventham as Irene Grant
- Karin Fernald as Anna Bergmann
- Michael Brennan as Donovan
- John Junkin as Kendall
- Jo Rowbottom as Marcia
- John Clive as Lenny
- Jerry Stovin as Barney Kershaw
- Richard Thorp as Pembridge
- Nicholas Selby as Detective Inspector Clayton
- Edward Dentith as Frank Crawford
