= Peter Yeldham =

Australian screenwriter (1927–2022)

Peter Yeldham OAM
- Born: 25 April 1927
- Died: 20 September 2022 (aged 95)
- Occupations: screenwriter, playwright and novelist
- Awards: Centenary Medal (2001)

Peter Alan Yeldham OAM (25 April 1927 – 20 September 2022) was an Australian screenwriter for motion pictures and television, playwright and novelist whose career spanned five decades.

== Biography ==
Peter Yeldham was born in Gladstone, near Smithtown, New South Wales, in 1927. Leaving Knox Grammar School at 16, Yeldham briefly became a jackaroo in Queensland. Then he returned to Sydney to join Radio 2GB, first as a messenger boy and then became junior scriptwriter. He wrote several scripts and a weekly column for the magazine The Listener In before being called up for the army at 18, going to Japan with the Occupation Force, where he served with the radio unit. After returning to civilian life he married and worked freelance, writing for Famous Trials, Medical File, Night Beat, The Golden Cobweb, For The Defence, and many other programs that he largely originated for Grace Gibson Productions. He also attempted to join the Sydney Morning Herald as a cadet journalist but was told they only accepted those with university degrees. Yeldham's young age may have worked for him at 2GB as he was instructed that the average mental age of the Australian radio audience was thirteen and to write accordingly.

In 1956, the year television arrived in Australia, he moved to England with his family where he remained for 20 years. He was given a reference to producer Harry Alan Towers. Thus began twenty years of writing for television and motion pictures in the United Kingdom. With independent television taking off in the British Isles, Yeldham was employed writing for such shows as Armchair Theatre, Shadow Squad, Dial 999, Espionage, Crime Sheet, Inside Story, No Hiding Place, The Persuaders, Probation Officer, The Third Man, Van Der Valk, Zodiak, The Zoo Gang and other British TV series.

Turning to feature films he wrote The Comedy Man and The Liquidator for producer Jon Pennington, as well as screenplays for Columbia, MGM, the Rank Organisation and producer Harry Alan Towers. He also adapted Norman Lindsay's semi-autobiographical novel Age of Consent into a 1969 movie of the same name that launched Helen Mirren's theatrical film career.

In 1969, after disagreements with Mirisch Films Oakmont Productions where he was engaged but not hired to write a war film to be made in England, Yeldham began writing plays for the theatre. The first, Birds on the Wing, had a long season in Berlin, and an extensive run in Paris, becoming Europe's top grossing play in 1972. It was adapted into a television series by Yeldham, starring Richard Briers.

Yeldham returned to Australia in 1976 where he wrote extensively for the ABC and independent producers, being the author of over fifteen mini-series including 1984's All The Rivers Run, and in 1987 Captain James Cook. His original title for the latter, The Wind and the Stars was changed against his wishes, the ABC and overseas investors insisting on the Cook title. The costly historical drama genre fell out of favour with the networks in the 1990s.

After adapting Bryce Courtenay's book Jessica, which won an award as best mini-series, he turned to writing novels, and in 2016 published his thirteenth book, Dragons in the Forest.

== Notable works ==
=== Motion pictures ===
- The Comedy Man (1964)
- Code 7, Victim 5 (1964)
- Twenty-Four Hours to Kill (1965)
- Ten Little Indians (1965)
- The Liquidator (1965)
- Our Man in Marrakesh (1966)
- The Long Duel (1967)
- Age of Consent (1969)
- The Call of the Wild (1972)
- Wicked City (1973)

=== Mini-series ===
- Watch the Birdies (1966)
- Birds on the Wing (1971)
- Run from the Morning (1978)
- Ride on Stranger (1979)
- Golden Soak (1979)
- The Timeless Land (1980)
- Sporting Chance (1980)
- Levkas Man (1981)
- All the Rivers Run (1982)
- 1915 (1982)
- Flight into Hell (1985)
- The Far Country (1986)
- Tusitala (1986)
- Captain James Cook (1987)
- The Heroes (1988)
- The Alien Years (1988)
- Naked Under Capricorn (1989)
- The Private War of Lucinda Smith (1990)
- The Lancaster Miller Affair (1990)
- Heroes II: The Return (1991)
- The Battlers (1994)
- Jessica (2004)

=== Plays ===
- Split down the Middle (1998)
- Seven Little Australians (Musical, 1988)
- Birds on the Wing (1970)
- My Friend Miss Flint (1984)
- But She Won't Lie Down: A Comedy Thriller in Two Acts (1978)
- Fringe Benefits (1977)
- Lighting Up Time: A Comedy (1977)

=== TV plays ===
- Reunion Day (1962)
- East of Christmas
- Stella (1964)

=== Books ===
- The Currency Lads (1988)
- Reprisal (1994)
- Without Warning (1995)
- Two Sides of a Triangle (1996)
- A Bitter Harvest (1997)
- Against the Tide (1999)
- Land of Dreams (2002)
- A Distant Shore (2009)
- Glory Girl (2010)
- The Murrumbidgee Kid (2007)
- Barbed Wire and Roses (2008)
- Above the Fold (2014)
- Dragons in the Forest (2016)
