= Fall of the Riau Islands =

1942 battle during the Pacific War in the Second World War

Battle of the Riau Islands
- Part of World War II, Pacific War, Dutch East Indies campaign
- Map of the Riau Islands
Date	Beginning of March 1942
Location	Riau Islands
Result	Japanese victory
Territorial changes	Integration of the Riau archipelago to Syonan-to

Belligerents
Netherlands: Dutch East Indies; United Kingdom	Japan: Syonan-to

Commanders and leaders
(Netherlands) J. H. de Vries; (Netherlands) G.A. Berg	(Empire of Japan) Tomoyuki Yamashita; (Empire of Japan) Renya Mutaguchi

Units involved
(Netherlands) KNIL Garrison: Tandjoengoeban Landstorm; P. Samboe Landstorm; Netherlands Navy (United Kingdom) Malaya Command Remnants	(Empire of Japan) 25th Army: 18th Infantry Division; 3rd Air Division; Japanese Navy

Casualties and losses
Netherlands: 4 killed 20 wounded	0
- 450 civilians killed 40 civilians injured More unaccounted for

The Battle of the Riau Islands (Dutch: Riouw) took place at the beginning of March 1942 during the Pacific War in the Second World War.

== History ==
The Riau Archipelago is a large group of more or less small islands located east of the island of Sumatra and south of the Malay Peninsula with Singapore at its tip in the Malay Archipelago. The largest islands in the archipelago are Batam and Bintan with the capital Tanjung Pinang. The islands belonged to the Dutch colony of the Dutch East Indies. In December 1941, several KNIL troops were stationed there for garrison duty only. They were all under the command of Major J. H. de Vries. Units for the Riau islands were segmented in two:

- Riouw & Dependencies Territorial Command: KNIL Garrison Battalion in Tanjungpinang
  - Mobile Auxiliary First Aid Platoon
- Landstorm Infantry Company in Tanjunguban in Bintan Island
- Landstorm Infantry Company in Sambu Island

The Island itself had a developed seaport for both ships and seaplanes to operate on.

=== Mining of the Singapore Strait ===
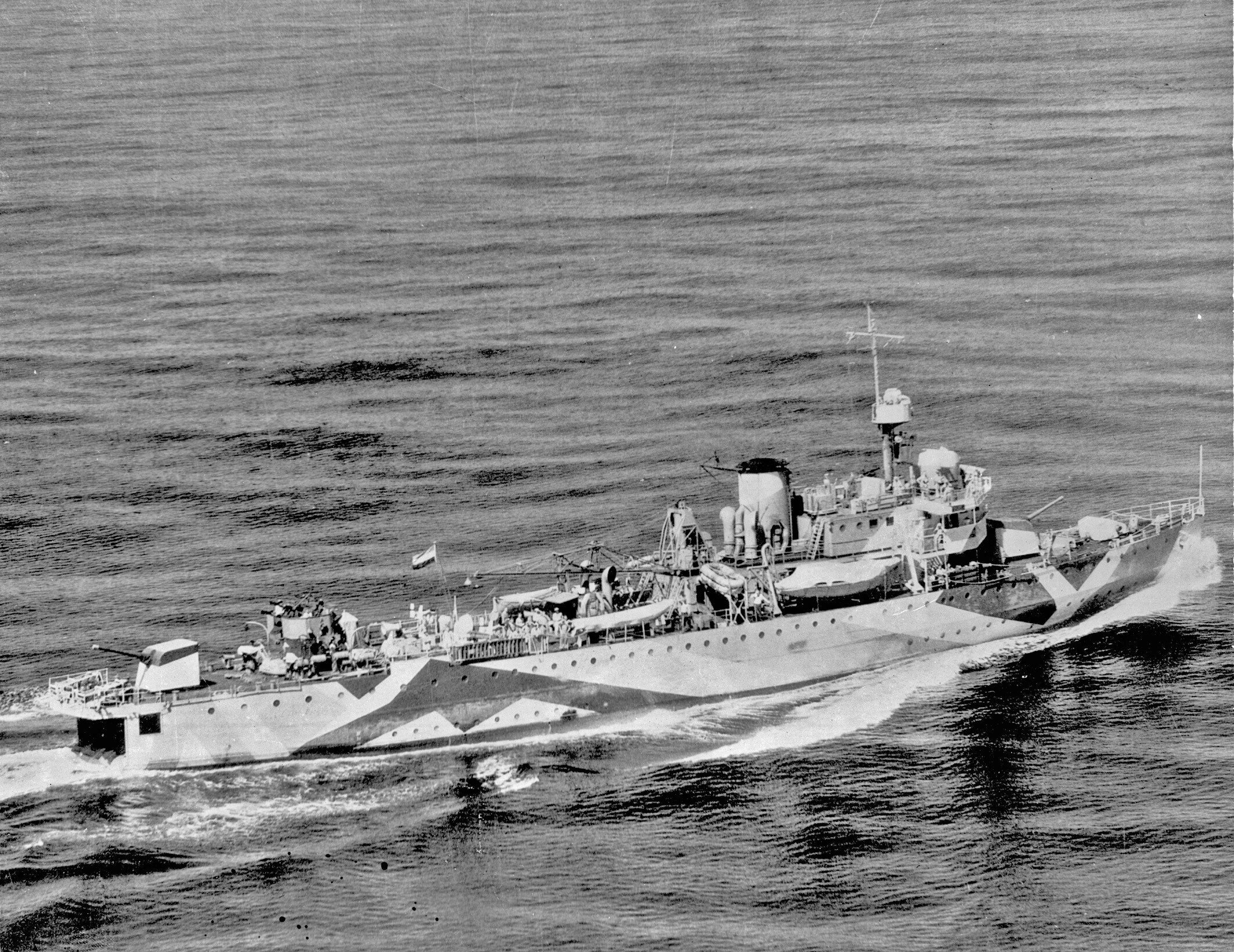
Willem van der Zaan in camouflage during war time, date unknown.

The Singapore Strait connects the Strait of Malacca with the South China Sea and separates the Malay Peninsula and the islands of Singapore from the Riau Islands. It forms the southern access route for ships to Singapore.

In the spring of 1941, the British delivered 560 Vickers H2 and 500 A Mark XIV sea mines to the Dutch and transported them to the Riau Archipelago. Although Dutch territory the British were eager to reinforce these islands in order to further safeguard Singapore, which was a British colonial territory. The British approached the Dutch in June 1940 about the possibility of mining the archipelago. They were aware of Dutch mine shortages and proactively offered to provide the weapons. The Dutch themselves wanted to protect the Riau Islands from Japanese attacks from the sea and accepted the offer. After a brief stop in retrieving the mines from Singapore in early 1941, the minelayer HNLMS Willem van der Zaan of the Zeemacht Nederlands-Indië (Royal Dutch Navy) was deployed to Riau in April. Whilst patrolling the Riau archipelago, she then received orders to mine the Singapore approaches and patrol the strait. On 8 December 1941 after the war with Japan began she laid planned minefields until 19 December where she was redeployed to Surabaya. During her time as a Minelayer in Riau, log reports indicated that she avoided a torpedo from a Japanese submarine and had captured a Japanese officer riding a native boat. From these period of time approximately 1,060 naval mines have been set up by HNLMS Willem van der Zaan.

On 1 January 1942, the Dutch shallop HNLMS Soemba, equipped as a gunboat, was stationed in the Riau archipelago for some time under Commander P. J. G. Huyer. She also laid sea mines in the Straits of Singapore. The gunboat was the first target when she came under attack while on patrol in the Riau Archipelago hours after the start of war. On 13 January 1942, HNLMS Soemba is attacked by three Japanese aircraft. Despite having no air cover, she drove them off and claimed one shot down without sustaining any damage. With the threat of damage, she was to be redirected to Lampung Bay on Sumatra.

== Attacks ==
=== Tambelan bombings ===
Japanese air forces targeted Allied and Dutch warships traversing the Strait of Malacca as part of their broader strategy to dominate Southeast Asia. Tarempa, located on the island of Matak, became a focal point of Japan's campaign to seize control of the south due to its strategic importance as a Dutch defense base. The city housed a critical radio station and a makeshift airport vital for Dutch military communications, making it a priority target. The first bombing of Tarempa occurred on 14 December 1941, executed by three squadrons of Japanese Navy warplanes.

The assault resumed on 19 December 1941 and had caused further destruction, later culminating with the landing of Japanese sea transport troops on 24–25 January 1942. The attacks resulted in significant casualties and devastation. Estimates indicate that at least 300 residents lost their lives, 40 were wounded, and 150 bodies were left unrecognizable due to the severity of the bombing. Facing an innumerable amount of civilian casualties on the island, this led Dutch officials to flee to Pekanbaru and Siak. Ending on 27 December 1941, the Japanese landed on the Tambelan Islands south of the Riau Archipelago, halfway between Singapore and Singkawang, Borneo. With this, it was the first time Japan had occupied an area that belonged to the Dutch East Indies.

=== Sinking of HNLMS Deneb ===
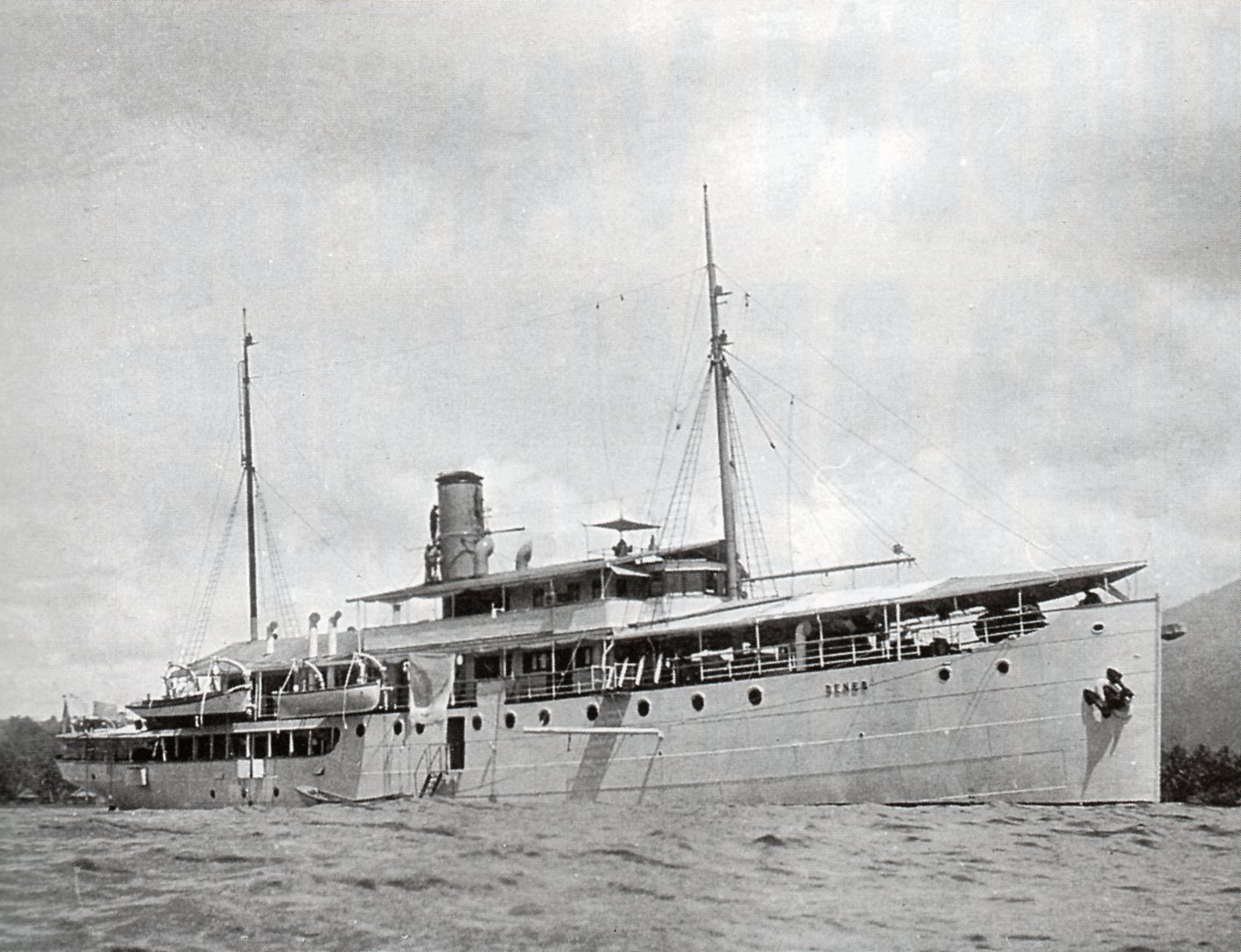
Government navy ship HNLMS Deneb, before it got militarized (1930)

As the Japanese intensified their anti-shipping missions in the South China Sea, on February 4, 1942, the HNLMS Deneb, flagship of the Gouvernmentsmarine's naval commander for the region, was anchored 500 yards west of South Brother Island alongside the auxiliary vessel Martha. The HNLMS Deneb was in the middle of a routine transfer of coastwatch personnel when seven Japanese twin-engine bombers appeared overhead. Despite prior enemy air activity in the area, little attention was initially paid to their approach until the bombers descended to a low altitude and opened their bomb bay doors. Built in 1915, the HNLMS Deneb was armed with outdated 37mm deck guns from 1890 and lacked anti-aircraft defenses. The Japanese bombers launched their attack with precision, scoring seven near misses and three direct hits, which violently shook the ship. The bombers also strafed the deck, while her crew returned fire ineffectively due to their antiquated weaponry.

As the bombers turned for a second run, several crew members leapt overboard to escape. Ten more bombs were dropped during the second pass, one of which struck the ship's stern, engulfing it in flames. Captain G.P. Berlijn gave the order to abandon ship, though the forward gun crew continued firing in an attempt to force the bombers to ascend to a higher altitude. The attack resulted in heavy casualties: four crew members were killed, and 20 were seriously injured. Amidst the chaos, two crewmen from the Martha, Ordinary Seaman-Signalman T.J. Zitter and Seaman-Signalman W.C.C. van Casand, boarded a motorboat and made multiple trips between HNLMS Deneb and the Martha, rescuing crew members from the burning ship and those struggling in the water. During these efforts, the Japanese bombers made a third pass, strafing the rescue efforts and targeting the motorboat. Despite the intense attacks, Zitter and van Casand remained unscathed that day. However, both were captured when Java fell a month later. The loss of the Deneb marked a significant setback for the Dutch naval forces in the Riau Archipelago, as this attack had effectively closed the ports of Sabang and Belawan to Allied operations. While Padang remained open, operating from the port became increasingly difficult. The loss of safe passage through the Malacca Strait also forced shipping to the United States to take longer routes through the Indian Ocean, further complicating Allied logistics in the region.

=== From Syonanto to Batam ===
Kofuku Maru, the vessel which evacuated all 262 Dutch civilians round trip to Sumatra before the Japanese arrived.

On 8 February 1942, General Tomoyuki Yamashita led a decisive attack against Allied forces in Singapore. Despite being outnumbered, the Japanese overwhelmed the Allies under Lieutenant General Arthur Ernest Percival through swift and accurate strategies. With the threat from Japanese forces growing stronger, Singapore in the brink of total collapse, airfields in Sumatra under heavy bombardment, and Banjarmasin captured, the garrisoned KNIL troops left the Riau Islands in fear on 14 February 1942 and fled to South Sumatra. Before collapse, the British Naval Command in Singapore assigned Australian civilian, Bill Reynolds, to evacuate 262 Dutch civilians stranded on Bintan Island, located approximately 128 km southeast of Singapore. Reynolds, an experienced navigator with nearly two decades of exploration in Malaya, Burma, and the Dutch East Indies, was exceptionally suited for the task. With the assistance of eight Chinese sailors, Reynolds repaired and commandeered an old seized Japanese fishing boat, the Kofuku Maru ("Lucky Ship"), from Singapore Harbor. Using his extensive knowledge of the region, he successfully transported the Dutch refugees to safety in Rengat, a small port on the Indragiri River in Sumatra. After a brief crash and multiple round-trips, he managed to successfully transport all 262 Dutch civilians on the island. Later totaling to 1500 people from Singapore and its surroundings. Bill Reynolds would later become an important figure as he would later use his services and his fishing boat, renamed as the Krait, as the centerpiece of Operation Jaywick, a daring 1943 Allied commando raid during which operatives infiltrated Japanese-occupied Singapore Harbor and sank 37,000 tons of enemy shipping using canoes.

On 15 February 1942, Singapore fell to the Japanese, following the capture of Singapore, Japan quickly moved to occupy nearby strategic locations, including Batam Island and Sambu Island. Both islands, close to Singapore, were vital for their oil resources. Despite the destruction, the Japanese occupation of Batam was completed without resistance by the Japanese, within days of their victory in Singapore. The Japanese would later station a small garrison there. On 20 February 1942, newspapers such as Het Volk and Haarlem's Dagblad reported the Japanese occupation of Batam and Sambu Island. These accounts described how Japanese troops encountered no resistance, taking over 15 oil tanks on Batam and 20 on Sambu Island. The British forces, garrisoned on both islands, implemented a scorched-earth policy, setting the oil tanks ablaze and inadvertently setting many native casualties before the Japanese arrived.

On 21 February 1942, Japanese forces took Tanjungpinang. Unlike other areas, the arrival of the Japanese in Tanjungpinang was warmly received by locals, with some Chinese community leaders, including Cia Sun Haw, Oei Cap Tek, and Cei Pit Sip, assisting the Japanese. This positive reception reflected the population's amazement at Japan's swift defeat of the Dutch, who had long been seen as invincible. The fall of Dutch defenses shattered this perception and created a growing sense of self-confidence and national consciousness among the local populace.

== Aftermath ==
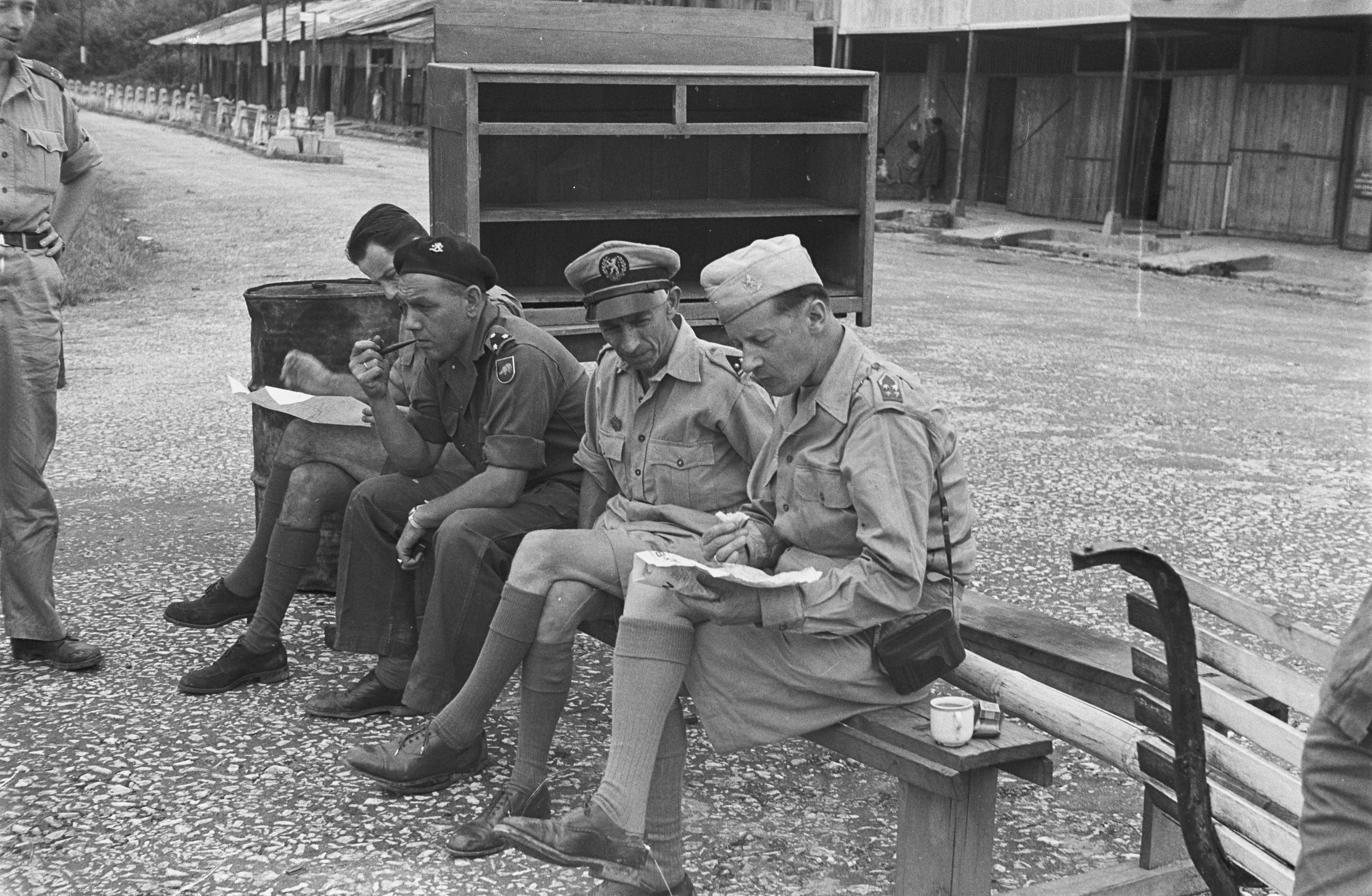
Major J. H. de Fries (right) with Major General Bert Sas next to him on 22 December 1947 in Indonesia

The Japanese administration of the Riau Islands was managed by the Imperial Japanese Navy in Syonanto (Singapore). Although it was formerly part of the Dutch East Indies's Riouw Recidency, Singapore under the Japanese had annexed the Riau Islands under a greater aglomeration due to proximity and ease of occupation. Governance in Riau was overseen by a Resident appointed from Syonanto, with the position initially held by G. Yogi, a former elite member of the Kwantung Army. District areas such as Tanjungpinang, Tanjung Balai Karimun, Dabo Singkep, and Tarempa were headed by To Co, while subdistricts (onderdistricthoofd) were managed by Sonco. Machinery from the bauxite mining company there was dismantled and shipped to Japan. Tarempa would later functioned as a Japanese power base for the marine corps (Kaiheidan) and Jutai troops.

On the Subi Islands in Natuna, an airfield was constructed in 1942 using forced labor (rodi). It was part of the Japanese effort to establish a robust defense network in Natuna. The island would later become one of the Japanese air defence centres in Indonesia, particularly in the north. As Subi Island's strategic importance lay in its location facing the South China Sea, making it a target for both Japanese fortification efforts and Allied attacks. The concrete airstrip was largely destroyed during the Dutch bombing campaign using high-explosive bombs. The bombings destroyed and sunk significant portions of the runway and island.
