= Operation Platypus =

WWII Allied reconnaissance mission

- Part of Borneo campaign of World War II
Date	20 March – 22 July 1945
Location	Balikpapan, Dutch Borneo

Belligerents
Australia; New Zealand	Empire of Japan

Commanders and leaders
Major D. J. Stott (MIA)	Unknown

Strength
Unknown	Unknown

Casualties and losses
2 missing	Unknown

Operation Platypus was an operation by Allied special reconnaissance personnel from Z Special Unit ("Z Force") during the Borneo campaign of World War II. Platypus involved small groups being inserted into the Balikpapan area of Dutch Borneo (Kalimantan), to gather information and organise local people as resistance fighters against the Japanese.

On 20 March 1945, Platypus 1 (also known as Project “Robin”) was carried out, using Hoehn folboats (collapsible canoes) and inflatable rubber dinghies that had been lashed to the side of the submarine USS Perch. Four members of Z Force, in two of the folboats, which had been fitted with outboard motors, travelled to shore 55 kilometres (34 mi) north of Balikpapan. As one of the motors failed to start, both crews resorted to paddling. One folboat, crewed by Sergeants Bruce Dooland (Australian Army) and Bill Horrocks (New Zealand Army), managed to reach the shore. The other folboat, carrying the mission commander Major D. J. (Don) Stott and his deputy Captain Leslie McMillan, both New Zealanders, capsized; both men were reported missing, presumed drowned. At other planned landing sites Japanese patrols were encountered and no further landings took place that night.

On the night of 22 March, the main body of Platypus 1, using folboats fitted with outboard motors, managed to land despite the motors failing. At one stage they were surrounded by Japanese patrols but managed to evade them.

Meanwhile Dooland and Horrocks used mirrors to signal Allied aircraft and were extracted by a US Catalina aircraft. To conceal operational techniques from the Japanese, their folboat was partly dismantled and stowed in the Catalina.

Eight further phases of Operation Platypus were carried out.

- 20–24 June 1945. Platypus 2, Platypus 3, Platypus 4 and Platypus 5, were carried out, when Z Special Unit personnel were deployed with their folboats, from a Catalina aircraft belonging to the US 7th Fleet, to gather information from local people.
- 30 June 1945 . There were also Platypus 6 and 7 when two parties of Z Commandos were dropped by a plane from Flight 200, into the Semoi area of Borneo on 30 June 1945.
- 3 July 1945, Platypus 8 party was flown by Catalina from Tarakan to Melintang lake to organise resistance. Party members: Capt D. Prentice (AU), Capt Max Horstink (DUTCH), Sgt Ali and a local from Samarina (Dutch National Archives, report by Capt M. Horstink 14 August 1945 archive 2.20.62 nr 217)
- 12 July 1945, Platypus 9 party was deployed by folboat via landing craft to Djinabora (upper Balikpapan Bay). and assisted in disrupting enemy barge traffic.
- 16 July 1945, Platypus 10 patrolled the Riko area using a folboat and a prahu – a robust, locally-built canoe.
- 22 July 1945, Platypus 11, the final operation of this series, used folboats to reconnoitre and pinpoint prospective target areas .
