= Z Special Unit =

Allied forces special unit in WWII

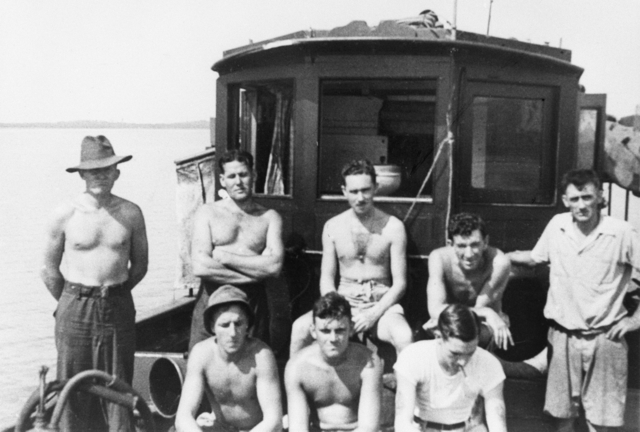
- Crew of the MV Krait during Operation Jaywick, 1943
- Active: 1942–1946
- Country: Australia; Netherlands; New Zealand; United Kingdom
- Allegiance: Allied
- Type: Special forces
- Part of: SRD, Allied Intelligence Bureau
- Engagements: World War II: Operation Scorpion; Operation Jaywick; Operation Rimau; Operation Binatang; Borneo campaign: Operation Semut; Operation Agas; Operation Python; Operation Copper; Operation Opossum; Operation Platypus

Z Special Unit (/zɛd/) was a joint Allied special forces unit formed during the Second World War to operate behind Japanese lines in South East Asia. Predominantly Australian, Z Special Unit was a specialist clandestine operation, direct action, long-range penetration, sabotage, and special reconnaissance unit that included British, Dutch, New Zealand, Timorese and Indonesian members, predominantly operating on Borneo and the islands of the former Dutch East Indies.

The unit carried out a total of 81 covert operations in the South West Pacific theatre, with parties inserted by parachuting or submarine to provide military intelligence and conduct direct action, irregular warfare (e.g. guerrilla warfare), long-range penetration, and special reconnaissance. The best known of these missions were Operation Jaywick and Operation Rimau, both of which involved raids on Japanese shipping in Singapore Harbour; the latter of which resulted in the deaths of 23 commandos either in action or by execution after capture.

Although the unit was disbanded after the war, many of the training techniques and operational procedures employed were later used during the formation of other Australian Army special forces units and they remain a model for guerrilla operations to this day.

== History ==
=== Formation and training ===
The Inter-Allied Services Department (IASD), was an Allied military intelligence unit, established in March 1942. The unit was created at the suggestion of the commander of Allied land forces in the South West Pacific area, General Thomas Blamey, and was modelled on the British Special Operations Executive (SOE) in London. It was renamed Special Operations Australia (SOA) and in 1943 became known as the Services Reconnaissance Department (SRD).

It contained several British SOE officers who had escaped from Singapore, and they formed the nucleus of the Inter-Allied Services Department (ISD) which was based in Melbourne. In June 1942, an ISD raiding/commando unit was organised—designated Z Special Unit.

Several training schools were established in various locations across Australia, the most notable being Camp Z in Refuge Bay, an offshoot of Broken Bay to the north of Sydney, Z Experimental Station (also known as the "House on the Hill" or ZES) near Cairns, Queensland, Fraser Commando School (or FCS) on Fraser Island, Queensland where a commemorative monument stands on the mainland overlooking the island. As a training exercise, one group led by Samuel Warren Carey paddled folboats between Fraser Island and Cairns. Another training school was the Special Boat Section at Careening Bay Camp, on Garden Island, Western Australia. Another, in Darwin on the site of the Quarantine Station, was named the Lugger Maintenance Section to disguise its true purpose.

=== Plans for an attack on Singapore ===
In 1943, a 28-year-old British officer, Captain Ivan Lyon of the Allied Intelligence Bureau and Gordon Highlanders, and a 61-year-old Australian civilian, Bill Reynolds, devised a plan to attack Japanese shipping in Singapore Harbour. Z Special Unit would travel to the harbour in a disguised fishing boat. They would then use folding kayaks to attach limpet mines to Japanese ships. General Archibald Wavell approved the plan, and Lyon was sent to Australia to organise the operation.

Bill Reynolds was in possession of a 21.3 m (70 ft) long Japanese coastal fishing boat, the Kofuku Maru, which he had used to evacuate refugees out of Singapore. Lyon ordered that the boat be shipped from India to Australia. Upon its arrival, he renamed the vessel MV Krait, after the small but deadly Asian snake. Lieutenant-Colonel G. Egerton Mott, the chief of the Services Reconnaissance Department, suggested that they should test the effectiveness of the plan by making a mock raid on a tightly guarded Allied port. Townsville, Queensland was chosen for the location of the attack.

=== Operation Scorpion ===
In January 1943, Lieutenant Samuel Warren Carey, a Z Special Unit officer based at Z Experimental Station, Cairns, Queensland, approached General Thomas Blamey with a proposition for a raid on the Japanese-occupied port at Rabaul, New Guinea. One submarine, with a small group of commandos on board, would be involved. The commandos would be dropped 16 km (9.9 mi) off Rabaul.

They would then use their Hoehn military folboats (collapsible kayaks) to travel into the harbour and attach limpet mines to as many enemy ships as possible. They would then retreat to a volcano section roughly 6 km (3.7 mi) south of Rabaul, where they would hide out until they could safely rendezvous with the submarine. Blamey was sure that the unit would be captured and shot, but he authorised the operation, and issued Carey carte blanche authority to perform whatever actions he deemed necessary during the planning of the proposed operation, which was codenamed Operation Scorpion.

By the end of March 1943, Carey had assembled a team of nine men on their base at Magnetic Island. Lyon and Mott arranged to have Carey's unit perform a mock attack on Townsville, although they were careful not to commit anything to paper. Townsville was a busy harbour full of troop transports, merchantmen and naval escort vessels, and tight security was maintained due to the constant threat of Japanese air and submarine attack.

At midnight on 22 June 1943, the unit left Magnetic Island and paddled by folboat through the heavily mined mouth of Townsville Harbour. Dummy limpet mines were attached to ten ships, including two destroyers. The men rowed into Ross Creek, dismantled and hid their folboats, then travelled into Townsville to find a place to sleep. Around 10:00 am, the limpets were discovered, and panic ensued.

Carey was arrested, and despite producing Blamey's letter and earnest assurances that the mines were dummies, they refused to allow him to leave or to allow the removal of the mines, which the RAN feared were real and might accidentally detonate. Mott was able to arrange Carey's release, but only on the condition that he left Z Special Unit. Operation Scorpion was scrapped due to a lack of submarine transport, but Mott and Lyon had learned many valuable lessons from the raid.

=== Operation Jaywick ===
Operation Jaywick was an Inter-Allied Services Department operation to infiltrate the Japanese-occupied Singapore Harbour and destroy shipping. On 2 September 1943, the Krait, with a crew of eleven Australian and four British personnel, left Exmouth Gulf, Western Australia. The group, commanded by Ivan Lyon, dyed their skin brown and hair black (the skin dye later caused many skin problems for the members of the team, including irritation and reactions in adverse amounts of sunlight). They also wore sarongs, so that they resembled Indonesian fisherman.

They arrived off Singapore on 24 September and that night six men left the boat. They paddled 50 km (31 mi) to a small island near the harbour where a forward base was established in a cave. On the night of 26 September, using folboats the party paddled into the harbour and placed limpet mines on several Japanese ships. The mines sank or seriously damaged four Japanese ships, amounting to over 39,000 tons. The raiders waited until the commotion had died down before returning to the Krait. On 19 October the Krait arrived back at Exmouth Gulf having achieved a great success.

=== Operation Rimau ===
Operation Rimau was a follow-up to the successful Operation Jaywick, which had taken place in 1943, being a further attack on Japanese shipping at Singapore Harbour. Rimau (Malay for "tiger") was again led by Lieutenant Colonel Ivan Lyon, a British officer on secondment from the Gordon Highlanders. Originally named Operation Hornbill, the goal of "Rimau" was to sink Japanese shipping by placing limpet mines on ships. It was intended that motorised semi-submersible canoes, known as Sleeping Beauties, would be used to gain access to the harbour.

Lyon led a Services Reconnaissance Department party of twenty-two men. They left their base in Australia aboard the British submarine HMS Porpoise (N14) on 11 September 1944. When they reached the island of Merapas, which was to be their forward base, it was discovered to be inhabited. To ensure that their stores would remain undiscovered by the natives one of the officers from the Porpoise, Lieutenant Walter Carey, remained on Merapas as a guard. The party then commandeered a Malay junk named Mustika, taking the Malay crew aboard the submarine. The SRD men transferred their equipment to the junk and the Porpoise departed. Lyon decided to drop off four more men with Carey: Corporal Colin Craft, Warrant Officer Alf Warren and Sergeant Colin Cameron.

Meanwhile, the Mustika neared its target. On the day of the planned attack, 10 October 1944, disaster struck. A Japanese patrol boat from the Malay Heiho challenged the Mustika and someone on board opened fire, killing three Malays. Their cover blown, Lyon had no option but to abort the mission. After scuttling the junk and the Sleeping Beauties with explosives, he ordered his men back to Merapas. Unbeknownst to Lyon, two Malays had escaped overboard during the firing and had made their way ashore to report the incident.

The Hoehn Mk III folboats stored in the Mustika were deployed to make the party's way to Merapas. Using these folboats, Lyon led a small force of six other men—Lieutenant Commander Donald Davidson, Lieutenant Bobby Ross, Able Seaman Andrew Huston, Corporal Clair Stewart, Corporal Archie Campbell and Private Douglas Warne—into Singapore Harbour, where they are believed to have sunk three ships. Lyon and twelve others were killed in action soon afterwards, and the remaining ten men were captured and later executed by beheading in July 1945.

=== Operation Copper ===
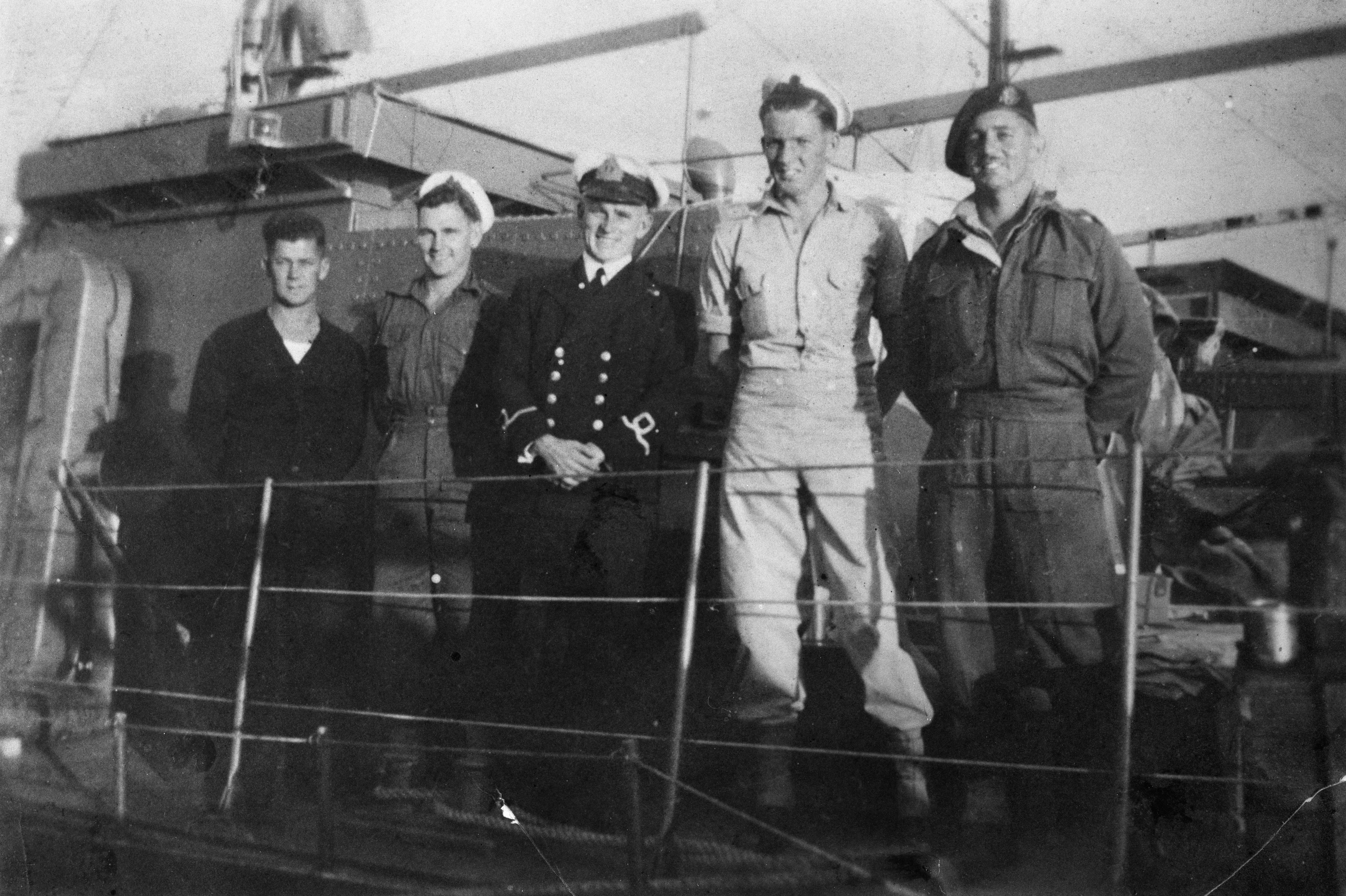
Four of the crew members of Motor Launch (ML) 1321 and NX73110 Sapper (Spr) Edgar Thomas 'Mick' Dennis, Z Special Unit, the only survivor of the ill-fated raid on Muschu Island (off the coast of New Guinea), at Brisbane dockyard. May 1945

Operation Copper was one of the last Z Special operations in New Guinea. On the night of 11 April 1945, eight operatives were landed near Muschu Island by HDML patrol boat. Their mission was to paddle ashore and reconnoitre the island to determine the status of Japanese defences and validate reports that two 140 mm long-range naval guns were still in position. Intelligence suggested that these weapons were back in service and could prove dangerous during the forthcoming invasion of Wewak, as they had sufficient range to fire into the proposed landing areas and, while they would not stop the Australian invasion, they could cause significant casualties.

Caught by unexpected currents the four folboats were pushed south of their landing area and came ashore amid a surf break. All boats were swamped and some items of equipment lost, but they made it ashore and harboured up until morning. At daybreak they commenced their reconnaissance of the island, soon encountering Japanese who, unbeknownst to them, had found equipment that was washed ashore further along the island. Thus alerted, the island became a hunting ground, with almost 1,000 Japanese searching for the patrol. Attempts to communicate by radio with the HDML patrol boat failed, as their radios had been swamped and the batteries ruined.

Of the eight men, only one survived. Sapper Mick Dennis, an experienced commando who had previously fought the Japanese in New Guinea in several significant engagements, escaped after fighting his way through Japanese patrols. He swam the channel to Wewak while being pursued by the Japanese and made his way through enemy territory to eventually meet up with an Australian patrol on 20 April. The information he returned with proved vital to keeping the guns out of action and in preventing the Japanese from using the island as a launching point for attacks against the Australian forces during the Wewak landings a month later.

In 2010 and 2013, expeditions to Muschu Island were conducted by MIA Australia, leading to the discovery of the remains of four of the Z Special Commandos lost on the Muschu raid. In late February 2014 it was announced that the remains of former St George first grade rugby league player, Lance Corporal Spencer Henry Walklate, and Private Ronald Eagleton, would be laid to rest in May 2014 with full military honours at the Lae War Cemetery, where the other five men from Operation Copper are buried.

=== Borneo ===
During 1943–45, Z Special Unit conducted surveillance, harassing attacks and sabotage behind Japanese lines in Borneo, as well as the training of natives in resistance activities. The first of these operations was Operation Python. Few details of these operations have been officially released, although details have emerged from the personal accounts of some Z Special Unit personnel. On 25 March 1945, Tom Harrisson was parachuted with seven Z Special operatives from a Consolidated Liberator onto a high plateau occupied by the Kelabit. An autobiographical account of this operation (SEMUT I, one of four SEMUT operations in the area) is given in World Within (Cresset Press, 1959); there are also reports—not always flattering—from some of his comrades. His efforts to rescue stranded American airmen shot down over Borneo are a central part of "The Airmen and the Headhunters," an episode of the PBS television series Secrets of the Dead.

Throughout June and July 1945, several operations under the aegis of Operation Platypus were launched in the Balikpapan area of Borneo.

== New Zealand recruits ==
During the southern winter of 1944, twenty-two New Zealand soldiers, based at Trentham Military Camp, 30 km (19 mi) north of Wellington, New Zealand, were sent to train with Z Special Unit in Melbourne, Australia. They were then sent to Fraser Commando School, on Fraser Island, Queensland, to be trained in using parachutes, unarmed combat, explosives and the Malay language. Four New Zealanders were killed during operations in Borneo.

Major Donald Stott and Captain McMillan were both presumed drowned in heavy seas while going ashore in a rubber boat from the submarine USS Perch (SS-313) in Balikpapan Bay on 20 March 1945. Their bodies were never found. Warrant Officer Houghton made it to shore in a second boat but was captured ten days later and languished in Balikpapan Prison where he died of beriberi about 20 April 1945.

Signalman Ernie Myers, a trained Z Special Unit operative in Platypus VII, parachuted into enemy-held territory near Semoi on 30 June 1945, but landed with two other operatives inside a Japanese camp area. They resisted strongly, but the Australian in the party was killed and Myers was captured along with the Malay interpreter of the group. Both men were tortured for three days, before being beheaded. Their bodies were recovered soon after the Japanese surrender when Lieutenant Bob Tapper, another New Zealander who was working with the War Graves Commission, discovered their remains. Evidence given to the commission by native witnesses ensured that the Japanese involved paid the penalty for this atrocity.

== Vessels allocated to Z Special Unit ==
=== Snake-class boats ===
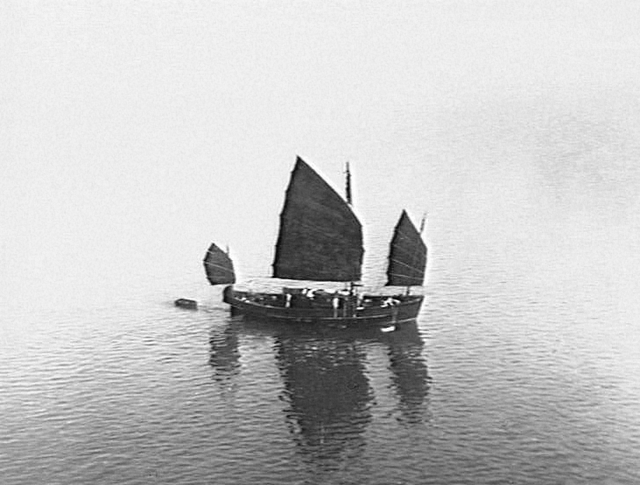
HMAS Tiger Snake in April 1945

The SRD used a number of vessels for its operations in South East Asia. Over the course of 1944–45 SRD took control of four 20 metres (66 ft) trawlers that were constructed at the naval dockyard in Williamstown, Victoria. These vessels were modified with more powerful engines and alterations were made to their superstructures in order to disguise them and make them look more like the types of vessels that were operating in the waters around South East Asia. They were designated "Snake-class" boats. Later, two more were built but they were not completed in time to see service during the war.

On operations the Snake-class vessels operated in tandem with a mother-ship. SRD operated two such vessels—HMAS Anaconda and HMAS Mother Snake—both of which were 38 metres (125 ft) long wooden motor vessels. There was a third vessel laid down—AV 1358 (Greenogh)—but it did not see service with SRD during the war. With a crew of 14, these vessels were mainly crewed by a mixture of Royal Australian Navy and Australian Army personnel with a naval lieutenant in command and an army captain as chief officer. The boats were officially commissioned ships and were outfitted with two 300–320-horsepower diesel engines and armed with one 20mm Oerlikon as well as a number of assorted smaller machine guns.

Of the Snake-class boats that saw service, at least three were used to deploy Z operatives with Hoehn military folboats in enemy occupied areas for reconnaissance or small scale raids. HMAS River Snake went to Portuguese Timor, to deploy SUNCHARLIE operatives. HMAS Black Snake deployed GIRAFFE and SWIFT operatives in the Celebes and HMAS Tiger Snake sailed out of Sarawak to set down operatives of SEMUT IVB.

After the war, the Anaconda remained in service until November 1946 when she was sold and converted into a fishing boat. The fate of the Mother Snake is unknown, although it is believed that she remained in Borneo after the war. The six Snake-class boats, however, along with the Krait were sold to the British Civil Administration in Borneo. The MV Krait was originally restored in 1964 and used for training and recreation purposes by the Royal Volunteer Coastal Patrol. The vessel is part of the Australian War Memorial's collection, on loan to the Australian National Maritime Museum in Darling Harbour, Sydney.

=== Other vessels ===
- AL254 Charm, a 14 m (47 ft) lugger.
- AM355, an 5.5 m (18 ft) launch.
- AB1184 3064 and AB1185 3065 (Both ALC15 landing craft).
- HDML 1321.
- HDML 1324.

== Legacy ==
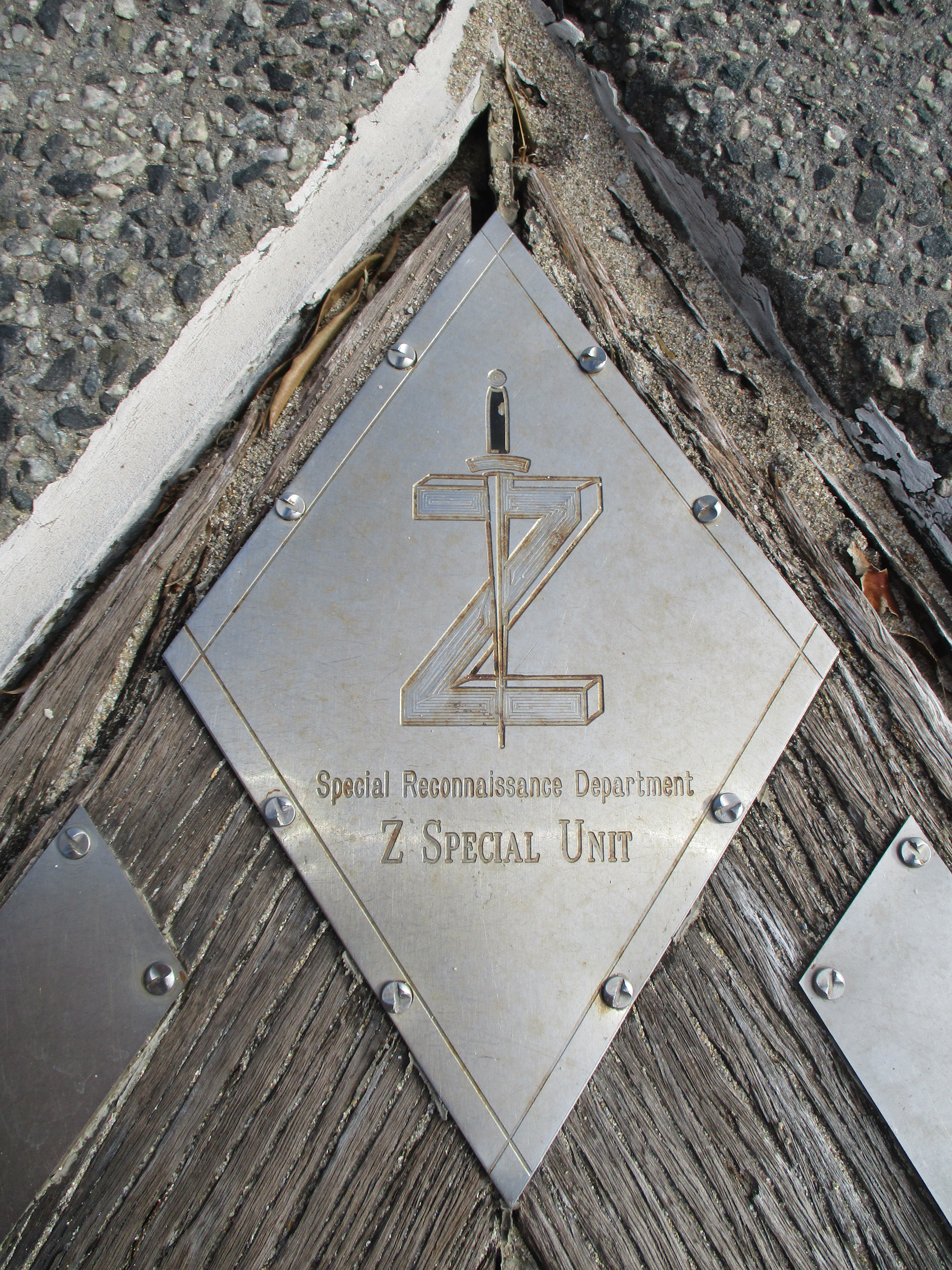
Commemorative plaque to the Z Special Unit at Rockingham, WA

There is now a public memorial to the Z Special Unit on the esplanade in Cairns. It was moved from the naval base HMAS Cairns and rededicated on 26 October 2007. Those present at the ceremony were original unit members George Buckingham, John Mackay and the then commander of Special Operations of the Australian Defence Force, Major General Mike Hindmarsh. The RSL plans to erect a permanent display of military equipments nearby.

Z Special Unit is one of the various special forces units commemorated on the New Zealand Special Air Service memorial at Papakura Military Camp in New Zealand.

The Z Special Unit Association (NSW Branch) was disbanded in March 2010 due to a decline in members and the Association's last Sydney ANZAC Day march was held in 2010. Commemorative plaques to Z Special Unit have been placed on each lamp post on the new jetty at Rockingham, Western Australia, and the activities of Z Special Unit have been depicted in several Australian films, TV series, and documentaries including Attack Force Z, The Highest Honor, The Heroes, Heroes II: The Return, and Australia's Secret Heroes.

As of 2022, there is only one surviving member still living, Allan Russell. In July 2023 Ken O'Brien who served with the unit celebrated his 100th birthday in Hobart.

== See also ==
- Allied Intelligence Bureau
- Far Eastern Liaison Office
- Secret Intelligence Australia
- Netherlands East Indies Forces Intelligence Service
