= Merapas Island =

Island in Indonesia

Coordinates: 0°56′00″N 104°55′25″E

Merapas Island is an Indonesian island in South East Asia. It is part of the Riau Islands, situated between Pulau Kayuara and Pulau Redang, and is also near Pulau Mapur and the town of Kawal.

It is best known for being an operational base for Operation Rimau during World War II.
