= Robert Page (soldier) =

Australian Army officer

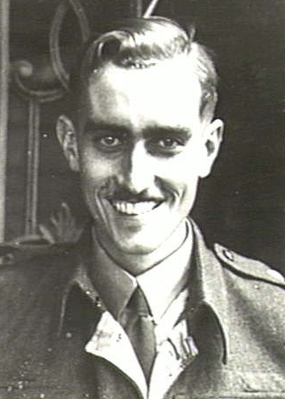
- Page in 1943
- Born: 21 July 1920; Summer Hill, New South Wales, Australia
- Died: 7 July 1945 (aged 24); Singapore
- Burial place: Kranji War Cemetery, Singapore
- Relatives: Harold Page (father); Sir Earle Page (uncle)
- Military career
- Allegiance: Australia
- Branch: Second Australian Imperial Force
- Service years: 1940–1945
- Rank: Captain
- Unit: Z Special Unit
- Conflicts: Second World War; Operation Jaywick; Operation Rimau
- Awards: Distinguished Service Order

Robert Charles Page, DSO (21 July 1920 – 7 July 1945) was an Australian soldier who was a member of Z Special Unit during the Second World War. He took part in Operation Jaywick and Operation Rimau, in which he was captured and executed by the Japanese. He was the nephew of Australian prime minister Sir Earle Page, and the son of Harold Page, who died as a Japanese prisoner of war in 1942. Page was played by John Howard in the film The Highest Honor (1983) and Chris Morsley in The Heroes (1989) and Heroes II: The Return (1991).
