= MV Krait =

Australian historic vessel

Coordinates: 33°52′6″S 151°11′59″E

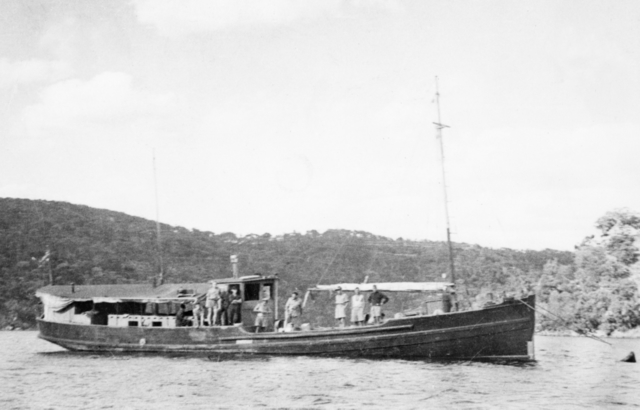
- Krait in Broken Bay in World War II

History

Australia
- Name: Krait
- Namesake: krait
- Captured: 1941
- Status: Museum ship 1985

General characteristics
- Tonnage: 68 gross tons
- Length: 21.33 metres (70.0 ft)
- Beam: 3.35 metres (11.0 ft)
- Draught: 1.5 metres (4.9 ft)
- Propulsion: Gardner 6LW diesel
- Range: 8,000 miles (13,000 km)

MV Krait /ˈkraɪt/ is a wooden-hulled vessel famous for its use in World War II by the Z Special Unit (Z Force) of Australia in the raid against Japanese ships anchored in Singapore Harbour. The raid was known as Operation Jaywick.

Krait is on display at the Australian National Maritime Museum (ANMM) in Sydney.

== History ==
Krait was originally a Japanese fishing vessel based in Singapore named Kofuku Maru. Following the outbreak of war, the ship was captured by the American destroyer USS Edsall and used to evacuate over 1,100 people from ships sunk along the east coast of Sumatra. The ship eventually reached Australia via Ceylon and India in 1942, and was handed over to the Australian military. In Australian service, she was renamed Krait after the small but deadly snake.

In September 1943, Krait transported members of Z Special Unit to Singapore, where they successfully raided the city's harbour, sinking seven ships, in what became known as Operation Jaywick. She returned to Australia in October. Krait was used by the Australian military throughout the war, and was present at the surrender of the Japanese forces on Ambon in September 1945.

Krait was later used as transport for intelligence-gathering missions to islands in the area, including Buru, Aru, Ceram, Banda, and Saparua. During this period, she carried several Japanese prisoners, army survey teams, and a naval intelligence officer.

At Ambon, the boat acquired a monkey as a mascot. He was named Peter and had lost his tail. Peter remained with the crew until Krait finished her service and was towed to Morotai. She was then sailed to Labuan, where she was sold and handed over to the British Borneo Company and where Able Seaman Robert Harry Easom of Perth kept its ensign as a souvenir. That ensign is now on display at the Australian War Memorial in Canberra.

After its sale, Krait was operated off Borneo, bought by a British sawmiller and was renamed Pedang (Sword). In the late 1950s, two Australians recognised Krait whilst on a timber-related business trip. A public appeal was made to purchase and return Krait to Australia, resulting in the forming of the Krait Trust Fund which successfully purchased Krait and return it to Australia in 1964.

Pedang was renamed back to Krait and was used as an Australian Royal Volunteer Coastal Patrol vessel performing patrol and search and rescue duties while also used for boating courses and school visits. On Anzac Day 1964, Krait was formally dedicated as a war memorial by the governor of NSW. A plaque was affixed to the wheelhouse. She was then acquired by the Australian War Memorial in 1985, put in the care of Sydney Maritime Museum and then permanently loaned to the Australian National Maritime Museum, where she has been displayed to the public in water since 1988.

Concerned with the deterioration of the boat, Douglas Herps, one of the surviving members of Z Special Unit, campaigned for the restoration of the boat and to display it on land. in 2013, Herps successfully campaigned for the boat to be restored but died before restoration started.

In 2017, restoration on the boat started with a $500,000 grant by the Australian Army and donations from the Australian War Memorial, the Australian National Maritime Museum and the Herps family. The restoration was done by Michael Bartley Shipwrights.

== Legacy ==
Since the success of Krait at Singapore, Australian Commando Unit vessels have traditionally used the names of venomous snakes. This tradition continues with Red Viper and Coral Snake as current examples.

== Gallery ==
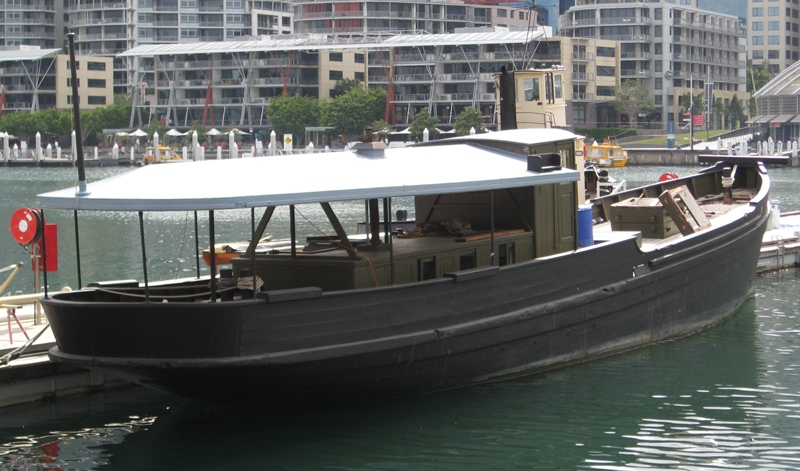
Krait on display at the Australian National Maritime Museum in 2008

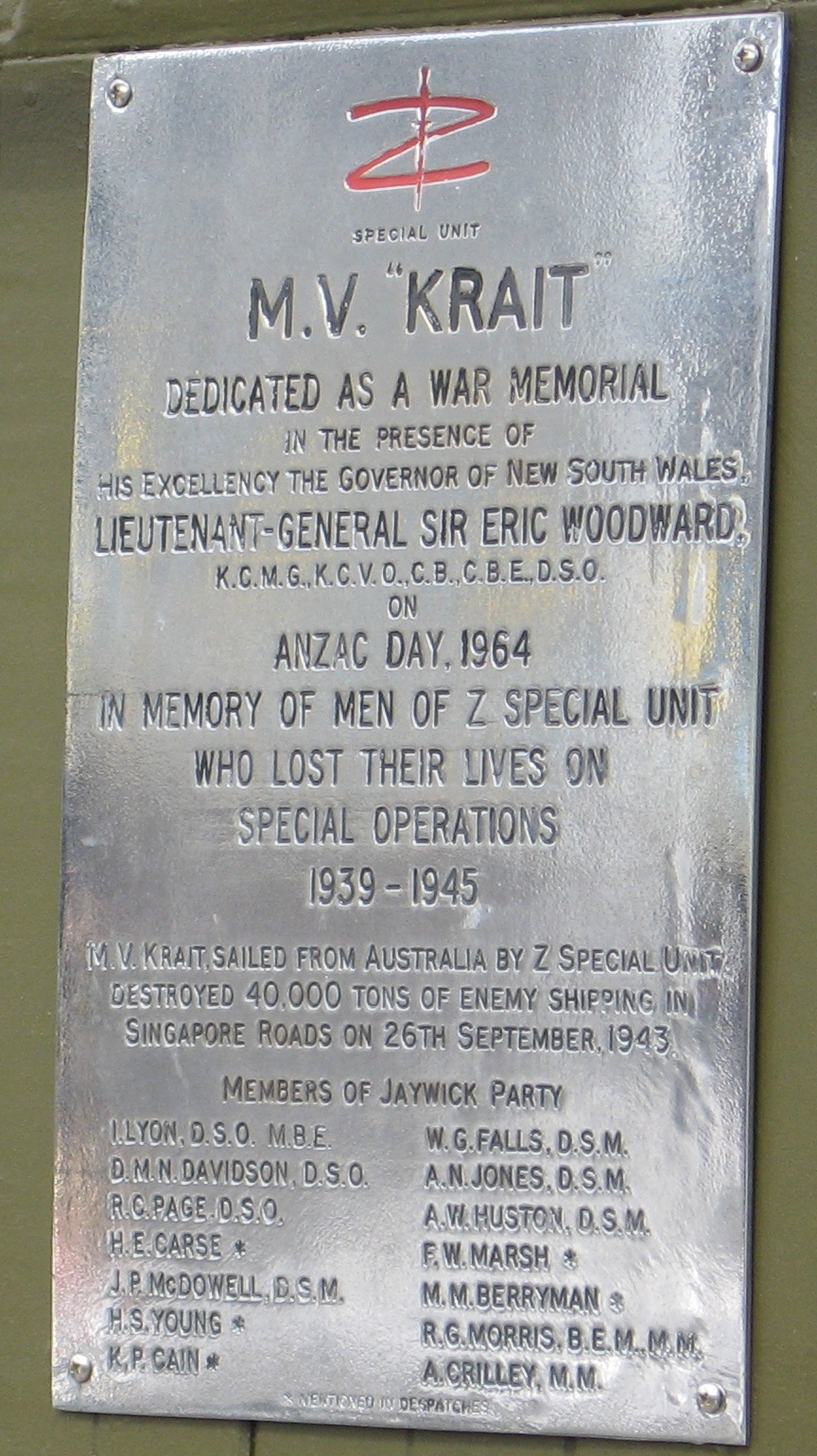
The plaque affixed to the wheelhouse in 1964 dedicating Krait as a war memorial

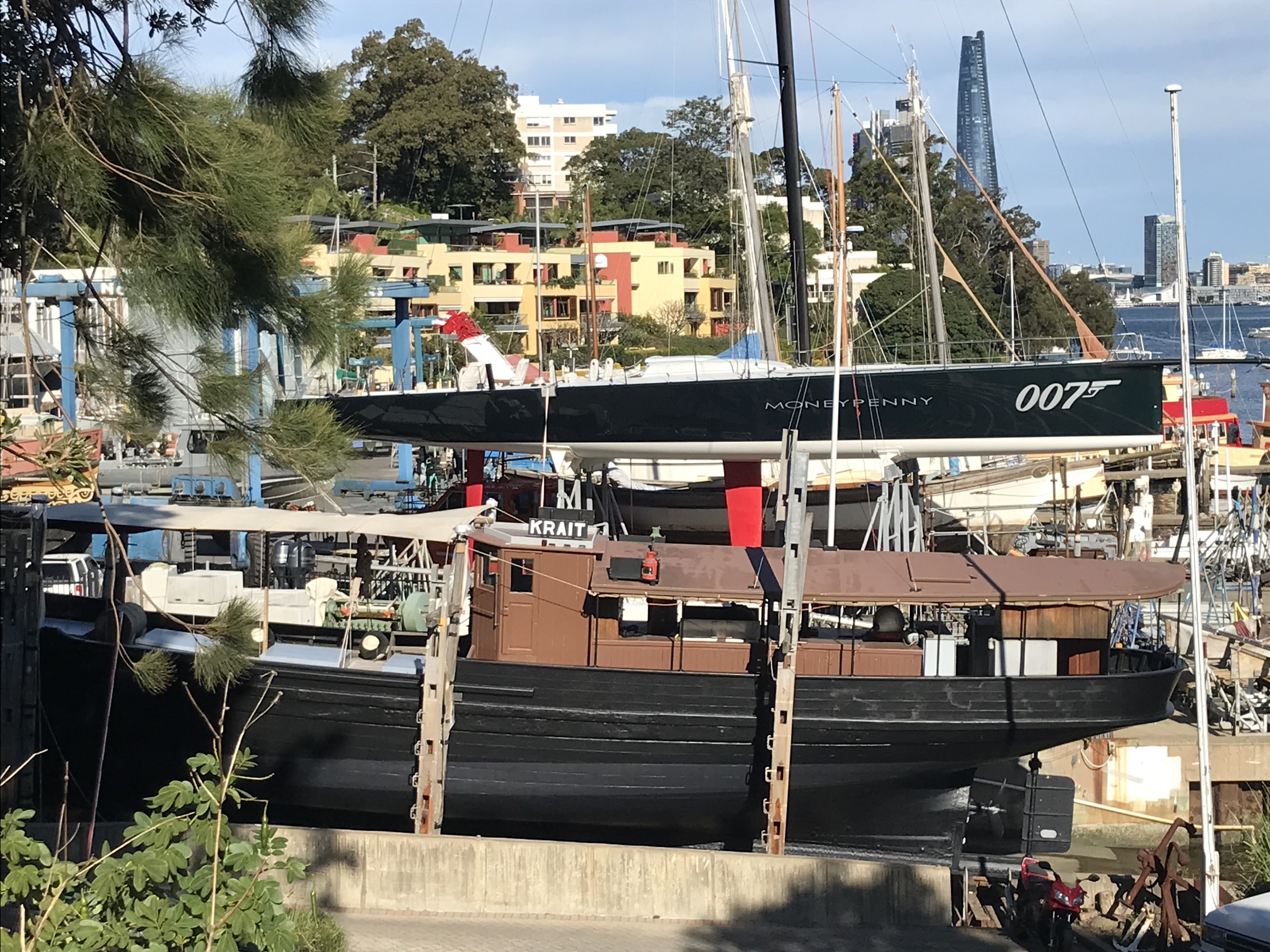
Krait undergoing restoration 2022

== Affiliations ==
- TS Krait, Australian Navy Cadets

== See also ==
- Australian commandos
