= Ivan Lyon =

British Army officer (1915–1944)

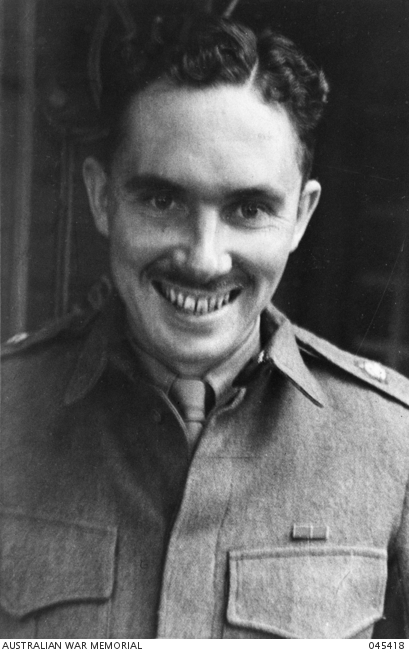
- Major Ivan Lyon in 1943
- Born: 17 August 1915
- Died: 16 October 1944 (aged 29); Soreh Island, Riau, Japanese-occupied Dutch East Indies
- Burial place: Kranji War Cemetery, Singapore
- Military career
- Allegiance: United Kingdom
- Branch: British Army
- Service years: 1935–1944
- Rank: Lieutenant colonel
- Commands: Z Special Unit
- Conflicts: Second World War; Pacific War; Battle of Singapore; Operation Jaywick; Operation Rimau †
- Awards: Distinguished Service Order; Member of the Order of the British Empire

Lieutenant-Colonel Ivan Lyon, DSO, MBE (17 August 1915 – 16 October 1944) was a British Army officer who served in World War II. As a member of Z Special Unit, Lyon took part in a number of commando operations against the Japanese and was killed during Operation Rimau while attempting to infiltrate Singapore's harbour and destroy Japanese shipping there in 1944.

== Early life ==
Born on 17 August 1915, Lyon was the second son of Brigadier General Francis Lyon, Royal Artillery, a senior British Army general staff officer during the First World War and the grandson of Colonel Francis Lyon, Royal Horse Artillery, who had fought in the Indian Mutiny. He was educated at Harrow and the Royal Military College, Sandhurst, and in 1935 was commissioned into the Gordon Highlanders before being posted to Singapore in 1936. While there, Lyon spent much of his spare time sailing around South East Asia. In 1939, he married Gabrielle Bouvier, the daughter of a French official in French Indochina, and fathered a son, Clive.

== Military career ==
=== Battle of Singapore ===
In mid-1940 Indochina became controlled by Vichy France and was occupied by the Empire of Japan later that year. As the prospect of war between the Allies and Japan loomed, Lyon undertook covert operations with Free French sympathisers in Indochina. After Japan invaded Malaya on 8 December 1941, Lyon's wife, daughter (Gabrielle's from a previous marriage), and son found themselves behind enemy lines and they spent the war in Japanese internment after the ship they were travelling on was intercepted by a German raider and they were taken prisoner. As the Japanese advanced towards Singapore, Lyon worked to form resistance groups among the local population. Later, he evacuated civilians from Singapore by boat, until its fall to the Japanese, in February 1942. During this period he met an Australian named Bill Reynolds, who operated a small ship called Kofuku Maru.

=== Operation Jaywick ===
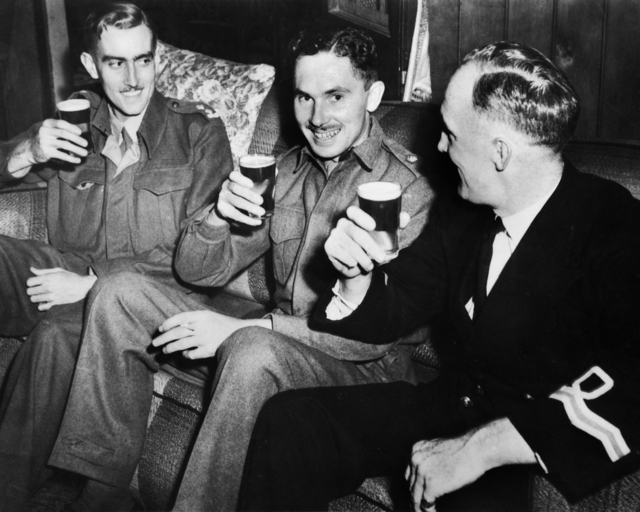
Lieutenant Robert Page, Major Ivan Lyon and Lieutenant D.M.N. Davidson enjoying beer in Brisbane after the completion of Operation Jaywick

Lyon and Reynolds both later joined Special Operations Australia (a joint Allied intelligence unit for operations in the South West Pacific). Lyon was appointed to lead an SOA commando unit, Z Special Unit or Z Force, as it was usually known. In September 1943, he led Operation Jaywick, using Kofuku Maru (which had been renamed Krait). Z Force sailed from Exmouth Gulf, Australia and raided Japanese ships in Singapore Harbour. They sank or seriously damaged six Japanese ships, amounting to over 39,000 tons of shipping, before returning to Australia after an 8,000 kilometres (5,000 mi) round trip.

=== Operation Rimau ===
Operation Rimau—an attempt to repeat the success of Jaywick—was launched in October 1944, with Lyon commanding a 23-man Z Special Unit raiding team again on a mission to sink Japanese shipping in Singapore Harbour. The party captured a Chinese junk and sailed towards Singapore, but were forced to abandon ship when they destroyed a Kempei Tei patrol boat that had approached them. Ordering his men to retreat back to Merapas island and await submarine rescue, Lyon and five others attempted a reduced-capacity raid on Singapore Harbour, destroying three ships. After a four-month series of island hops and often ferocious battles with large numbers of Japanese forces, the entire 'Rimau' party were either killed during combat (Lyon was the first of these), drowned or captured. Those captured were executed by beheading after a sham trial shortly before the Japanese surrender.

Lyon died on the tiny island of Soreh on 16 October 1944, whilst fighting a rearguard action to assist the getaway of two injured members of the 'Rimau' party. Discovered by a Japanese landing crew, Lyon—together with Corporal Clair Stewart and Lieutenant Robert 'Bobby' Ross, and the injured Private Archie Campbell and Lieutenant-Commander Donald Davidson—engaged the Japanese in battle, killing and injuring seven. The remaining Japanese escaped. Knowing that the Japanese would come back in a matter of hours with reinforcements—and that there was no possibility of island-hopping to safety with two injured and exhausted comrades—Lyon made the decision to dose the injured Davidson and Campbell with morphine, and set them on their way towards the nearby island of Tapai, where other members of the Rimau party were known to be holed up.

Lyon set about creating rudimentary defenses, taking into account the position of a Malay household. The danger of accidentally involving the occupants of the shack in the forthcoming battle led Lyon to switch the position of his defenses away from this location, a formidable task given that the tiny island was bereft of significant cover, and almost entirely indefensible in the daylight. Lyon and Ross climbed a large Ru tree, having first equipped themselves with a massive amount of magazines and grenades. Corporal Stewart was positioned in a stone-lined ditch, about 30 metres (98 ft) to their left, together with a cache of grenades and ammunition for the Silent Stens that all three carried.

The Japanese returned two hours later, consisting of approximately 110 soldiers. For almost four hours, the Japanese suffered tremendous losses, unaware that their enemy was in fact firing from high above them, as well as being caught repeatedly by the grenades thrown by the unseen Stewart. At midnight, Japanese soldiers finally caught sight of the tiny muzzle flashes from the Silent Stens. Grenades were thrown above the branches; Ross and Lyon fell down from the branches, killed by shrapnel. They had accounted for over sixty dead and wounded Japanese. Stewart remained undiscovered on the island, but marooned as his folboat had been taken by the Japanese. Stewart was eventually caught and taken, after a series of different island jails, to Singapore, and executed there along with the rest of the captured party on 7 July 1945.

After the war, Lyon's remains were found and reburied at Kranji War Cemetery on Singapore Island. A memorial tablet was placed on the outside of Saint George's Church, Singapore.

Lyon's wife, Gabrielle, and son, Clive, imprisoned in a Japanese internment camp from December 1941, survived the war.
