= Operation Rimau =

Allied attack during World War II

Coordinates: 1°17′15.93″N 103°51′56.93″E

- Part of the Japanese occupation of Singapore during World War II
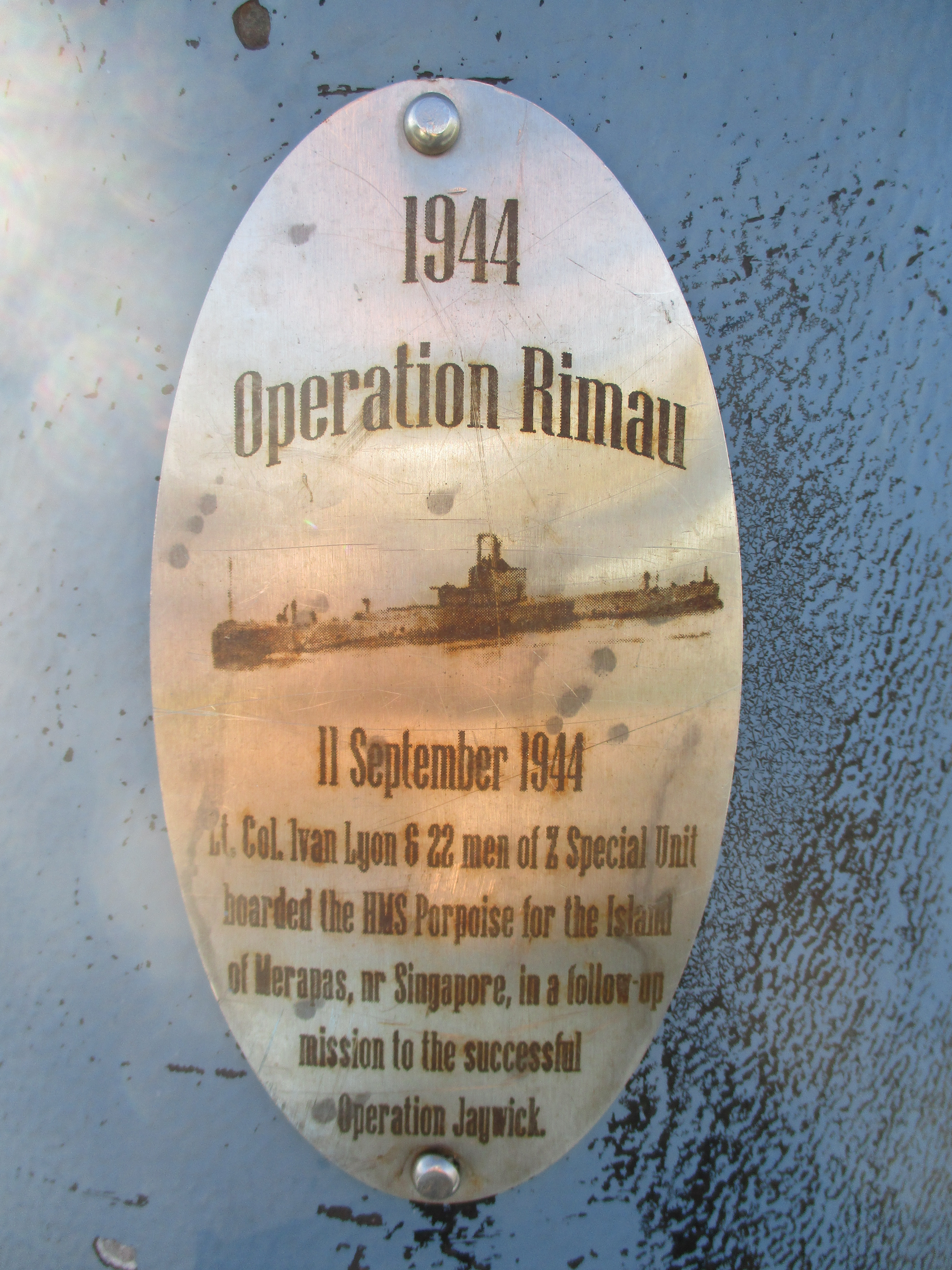
- Operation Rimau commemorative marker, Rockingham, Western Australia
Date	10–16 October 1944
Location	Singapore Harbour; Riau, Indonesia
Result	Japanese victory

Belligerents
Empire of Japan	Z Special Unit

Commanders and leaders
N/A	(United Kingdom) Ivan Lyon †

Strength
N/A	23 commandos 1 junk

Casualties and losses
claimed 3 ships sunk	1 junk scuttled 13 killed or died in custody 10 executed

Operation Rimau was an attack on Japanese shipping in Singapore Harbour, carried out by an Allied commando unit Z Special Unit, during World War II using Australian built Hoehn military MKIII folboats. It was a follow-up to the successful Operation Jaywick which had taken place in September 1943, and was again led by Lieutenant Colonel Ivan Lyon of the Gordon Highlanders, an infantry regiment of the British Army.

Originally part of a much larger operation called Operation Hornbill, the aim of Rimau was to sink Japanese shipping by paddling the folboats in the dark and placing limpet mines on ships. It was originally intended that motorised semi-submersible canoes, known as "Sleeping Beauties", would be used to gain access to the harbour, however, they resorted to folboats. After the raiding party's discovery by local Malay authorities, a total of thirteen men (including raid commander Lyon) were killed during battles with the Japanese military at a number of island locations or were captured and died of their wounds in Japanese captivity. A group of ten commandos were transported to Outram Road Jail in Singapore after capture by the Japanese, were tried on charges of perfidy and espionage in a Japanese kangaroo court and executed on 7 July 1945.

== Planning ==
Following the results of Operation Jaywick in September 1943, Lieutenant-Colonel Ivan Lyon started planning for a bigger attack on Japanese-occupied Singapore by early January 1944. 'Rimau' is the Malay word for 'tiger' and Lyon had a large multi-coloured tiger head tattooed on his chest.

The plan was to deliver commandoes to enemy waters via submarine with 15 one-man motorised submersible canoes known as "Sleeping Beauties" (SB). The commandoes were to travel to the uninhabited Merapas Island in Indonesia which they would use as a base and place enough supplies for three months. The commandoes would then capture a small local fishing boat, disguised as locals, to sail towards the Singapore Harbour undetected and to reach the Bay of Kepala Jernih (in the Tambelan Archipelago) late on 9 October 1944 for 24 hours to allow an officer to carry out a reconnaissance from Pulau Subar. After surveillance of the targets, the officer is to rendezvous with the junk to participate in the attack;

Two canoes would travel north to the vicinity of Labon Island to secure a hide for the junk and for another canoe to proceed to Subar. In the darkness, the crew was to move the junk to an attack base at Labon. Via the SB, the party was to attach limpet mines to Japanese ships, sink thirty of them, damage another thirty, and escape to their base on Merapas Island by paddling their way back in two-man folboats, seventy miles to the east of Singapore. The party is to rendezvous with the submarine on 7/8 November 1944 at Merapas Island and if the submarine failed to make contact with them it would stay in the area, returning to the designated point every night until 8 December 1944.

The main differences from Operation Jaywick were the delivery of mines by SB with a larger operational team (23 as opposed to 14). The operation team had to capture a boat rather than sailing in a boat to Singapore.

The mission consisted of 23 men with an additional two performing the duties of "conducting officers".

The members of the team were:

- Lieutenant Colonel Ivan Lyon*,
- Lieutenant Commander Donald Davidson, RNVR*;
- Major Reginald Ingleton, RM;
- Captain Robert Page*;
- Lieutenant Bruno Reymond, RANR;
- Lieutenant Walter Carey – conducting officer,
- Lieutenant Robert Ross,
- Lieutenant Albert Sargent,
- Lieutenant Walter Chapman – conducting officer;
- Sub-Lieutenant Gregor Riggs, RNVR
- Warrant Officer Alfred Warren;
- Warrant Officer Jeffrey Willersdorf – Maintenance Technician.;
- Sergeant Colin Cameron – Maintenance Technician;
- Sergeant David Gooley – Maintenance Technician;
- Corporal Archie Campbell;
- Corporal Colin Craft – signaller;
- Corporal Roland Fletcher – Infantry and Maintenance;
- Corporal Hugo Pace – Infantry and Maintenance;
- Corporal Clair Stewart – signaller;
- Lance Corporal John Hardy – Infantry and Maintenance;
- Able Seaman Walter Falls*;
- Able Seaman Andrew Huston*;
- Able Seaman Frederick Marsh*;
- Private Douglas Warne – Infantry and Maintenance

(* former member of Operation Jaywick)

== Operation ==
Lyon and his men left their base in Garden Island in Western Australia aboard the British submarine HMS Porpoise on 11 September 1944.

The submarine reached the island of Merapas off the coast of Pulau Bintan on 23 September 1944. Although the island was believed to be uninhabited, a periscope reconnaissance the following day spotted three Malays beside a canoe on the beach.

To ensure that their stores would remain undiscovered by the natives, one of the officers from the Porpoise, Lieutenant Walter Carey, remained on Merapas as a guard.

The rest of the party stayed in the Porpoise which moved off on the evening of 24 September 1944 to capture a native boat. It followed Karimato Strait along the Borneo coast.

=== Capture of Mustika ===
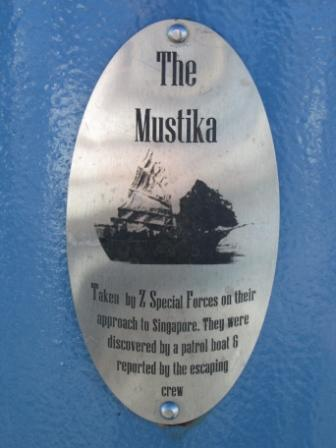
Commemorative marker for the Mustika at Rockingham, Western Australia

On the afternoon 28 September 1944 the Porpoise stopped a junk from Ketapang named the Mustika off the west coast of Borneo near Pontianak. Seven commandoes boarded the boat and nine Malay crew were taken aboard the submarine.

Twelve minutes later, Porpoise submerged with both vessels making their way back west towards a forward operational base at Pedjantan Island.

Over the next two nights, 29–30 September 1944, the Rimau commandoes, the SBs, folboats and other stores were transferred from Porpoise to Mustika.

Once completed on 1 October 1944 the second conducting officer, Major Walter Chapman and Mustika's Malayan crew returned to Australia in HMS Porpoise. (The Malay crew would be transported to Fremantle where they stayed for the rest of the war.)

Porpoise arrived safely back in Fremantle on 11 October 1944. On 15 October 1944, Chapman, along with Corporal Ronald Croton, embarked in the submarine HMS Tantalus under the command of Lieutenant Commander Hugh Mackenzie. This submarine was conducting an offensive patrol in the South China Sea and was due to rendezvous with the Rimau party on 8 November 1944.

=== Return to Merapas Island ===
Mustika returned via the Java Sea and Karimata Straits to Merapas Island. The Rimau Commandos disguised themselves as Malays by wearing sarongs and dyeing their skin. The Mustika had no engine though so the commandoes were dependent on winds.

The Mustika arrived at Merapas on 4 October 1944. It appears Lyon decided to divide the party into two groups: 19 commandoes to take part in the raid, while four men would be left behind. These were meant to be Carey, Warren, Craft and Cameron or Pace.

The Mustika then headed toward Singapore Harbour, reaching the vicinity of the harbour on or around 6 October 1944. It was thought to have been off the west coast of Pulau Batam. Pulau Laban is located at a distance of 11 miles from Keppel Harbour and was the intended forward point from which the attack was to be launched.

=== Contact with Japanese ===
On 10 October 1944, two hours before sunset and an hour before the raid was to commence, disaster struck. A coastal Malay Police patrol boat, the Hei Ho, challenged the Mustika near Kasoe Island and Samboe Island. (The Japanese had increased surveillance of the area since Operation Jaywick.) It is unclear why the patrol boat approached the Mustika – various theories offered included: the ship flew the wrong flag; it was a suspicious size; the sailors were identified as white men, and not Malays.

Shots were fired between the vessels – it was later deduced one of the Australian commandos aboard panicked and started firing at the approaching patrol boat. Some of the patrol boat crew were killed but at least one escaped and managed to get back to report the incident.

Lyon knew the patrol boat would seek help from Japanese occupation authorities and decided to abort the mission. He scuttled the junk and the Sleeping Beauties (which were top secret weapons at the time) with explosive charges. He then ordered his men to divide into four groups and make their way back to Merapas by use of the folboats that they had stored on Mustika. The groups were led by Lyon, Davidson, Page and Ross.

=== Attack on Singapore Harbour ===
Three of the groups headed to Merapas immediately. Lyon led his group into Singapore Harbour. It consisted of himself and a small force of six other men — Lieutenant Commander Donald "Davo" Davidson, Lieutenant Bobby Ross, Able Seaman Andrew "Happy" Huston, Corporal Clair Stewart, Corporal Archie Campbell and Private Douglas Warne.

They are believed to have sunk three ships with limpet mines, although evidence confirming this is limited.

The Singapore Garrison of the Imperial Japanese Army did unleash a punitive force of at least 100 soldiers led by Major Hajime Fujita including army, navy and native police to find the commandoes.

=== Initial flight ===
It is probable that some of the folboat parties stopped on the headland of north-western Batam and left. Batam had been used during Operation Jaywick as a hiding place by Davidson in 1943.

On 14 October 1944 some commandos were reported as being on Pankgil Island (thought now to most likely be Page's group). Japanese soldiers were sent to the island but did not find them.

=== Battle of Soreh Island ===
On 15 October, five of the men (Lyon, Davidson, Ross, Stewart and Campbell) were on Soreah Island, or Pulau Asore, a small island just off Pulau Mapur, near Pankgil Island.

A Japanese patrol caught up with them and arrived at the island at about 1400 hours and a gun battle ensued. The Australians withdrew to the western end of the northern beach, having selected two defensive positions in an unexposed area.

The Australians ambushed the Japanese and their native auxiliaries. A gun battle ensued. Davidson and Campbell were severely wounded. Lyon, Ross and Stewart stayed on Soreh to hold off the Japanese in order for the wounded duo to escape.

Lyon, Ross and Stewart held off 80–90 opposing soldiers forcing them to fight for 9 hours and inflicting heavy casualties. Lyon and Ross had climbed trees for an elevated firing position, and remained unseen until muzzle flashes betrayed their positions and they were killed by grenades. Stewart remained at large, but his folboat was taken and he was found days later on a subsequent sweep of the island.

=== Tapai Island ===
The wounded Davidson and Campbell made it by folboat to Tapai Island on 16 October 1944. Both men died there, either from their wounds or committing suicide by cyanide capsule.

=== Merapas Island ===
On 4 November eighteen of the group were together on Merapas Island. A small Japanese force landed on the island, and was attacked by the commandos. Two of the Rimau commandos – Riggs and Sergeant Colin Cameron – were killed in combat on the island, while the remainder now split into two groups and went to different islands.

(The bodies of Riggs and Cameron were discovered on Merapas in 1994.)

=== Rescue mission ===
Australian forces intercepted a Japanese coded message reporting activity by about twenty commandos in the attack area. However, if the Australians had responded, it would have shown that the Allies had broken the Japanese secret codes. So the appointed rescue submarine was not told of the sudden urgency of the situation.

The orders to the commander of the rescue submarine, HMS Tantalus, Lieutenant Commander Hugh Mackenzie, were to go to the rescue rendezvous area of Merapas Island on 7 November 1944, and to remain there until 7 December 1944 if necessary.

The Tantalus left Australia on 15 October 1944. The orders of the captain stated:

The Commanding Officer HMS Tantalus is responsible for the safety of the submarine which is to be his first consideration and has discretion to cancel or postpone the operation at any time.... Subject to patrol requirements HMS Tantalus will leave her patrol at dark on 7 November and proceed to the vicinity of Merapas Island.... In the event of the pick up party and the RIMAU party failing to keep the rendezvous for the embarkation, the greatest caution is to be exercised by Tantalus, who should not hesitate to abandon the operation if contact is not re-established, or if he has some reason to suspect that the operation is compromised.

On 7 November 1944 ten of the Rimau commandos were in place to meet the rescue submarine but it did not appear, as Mackenzie had instead chosen to hunt for enemy shipping in the area. He made this decision in consultation with Major Chapman, Z Special Unit's contact on the submarine. Tantalus's main objective was offensive action against the Japanese and the orders to the Rimau party were that they might expect to be picked up at any time within a month of the initial rendezvous date.

On 21 November 1944 the submarine reached Merapas Island. Chapman and another commando, Corporal Croton, were worried about the surf and directed their landing folboat around the island to calmer waters, away from the set position at 0200. Chapman wanted to head back to the submarine but Croton drew his pistol and forced Chapman on.

Croton and Chapman arrived at the designated meeting point after dawn on 22 November 1944. They found some evidence of the commandos having been there – the beginnings of a large lean-to shelter in a clearing at the top of a hill, away from the original base site; empty rations tins; half-cooked food on 'Commando Cookers'; fires seemingly kicked out; a few pieces of silver foil; empty cigarette cartons. They did not question local people about what happened.

Croton and Chapman returned to the submarine. Chapman and Mackenzie agreed that the operation had likely been a failure and that no purpose could be served in returning to Merapas, contrary to what had been planned.

Tantalus resumed its patrol and arrived back in Fremantle on 6 December 1944 having never returned to Merapas Island.

None of the officials in Australia who knew that the Rimau commandos were in trouble tried to contact the submarine and order them to remain in the area for any survivors.

=== Attempted escape ===
Once the 7 December 1944 final deadline passed, the survivors realised that they would not be rescued. They attempted to make their way home the 3,000-kilometre distance to Australia.

Over two weeks nearly all the men were either captured, killed in firefights or drowned.

Two men, Willersdorf and Pace were captured on 17 January 1945 on Romang island, Indonesia, some 350–400 miles from Australia after a journey of approximately 2,000 miles by folboat. Willersdorf died of his wounds in Japanese captivity in Dili, East Timor in March 1945. Pace died of starvation several months later in June 1945 in the same facility. Both were buried on a hill approximately 200 metres from the prison facility.

Warne was able to evade Japanese patrols until March 1945 but was captured after a bout of delirium brought on by fever. He was taken to Surabaya under the control of the Naval Police and interrogated so brutally he died of untreated wounds one month later.

=== Capture and execution ===
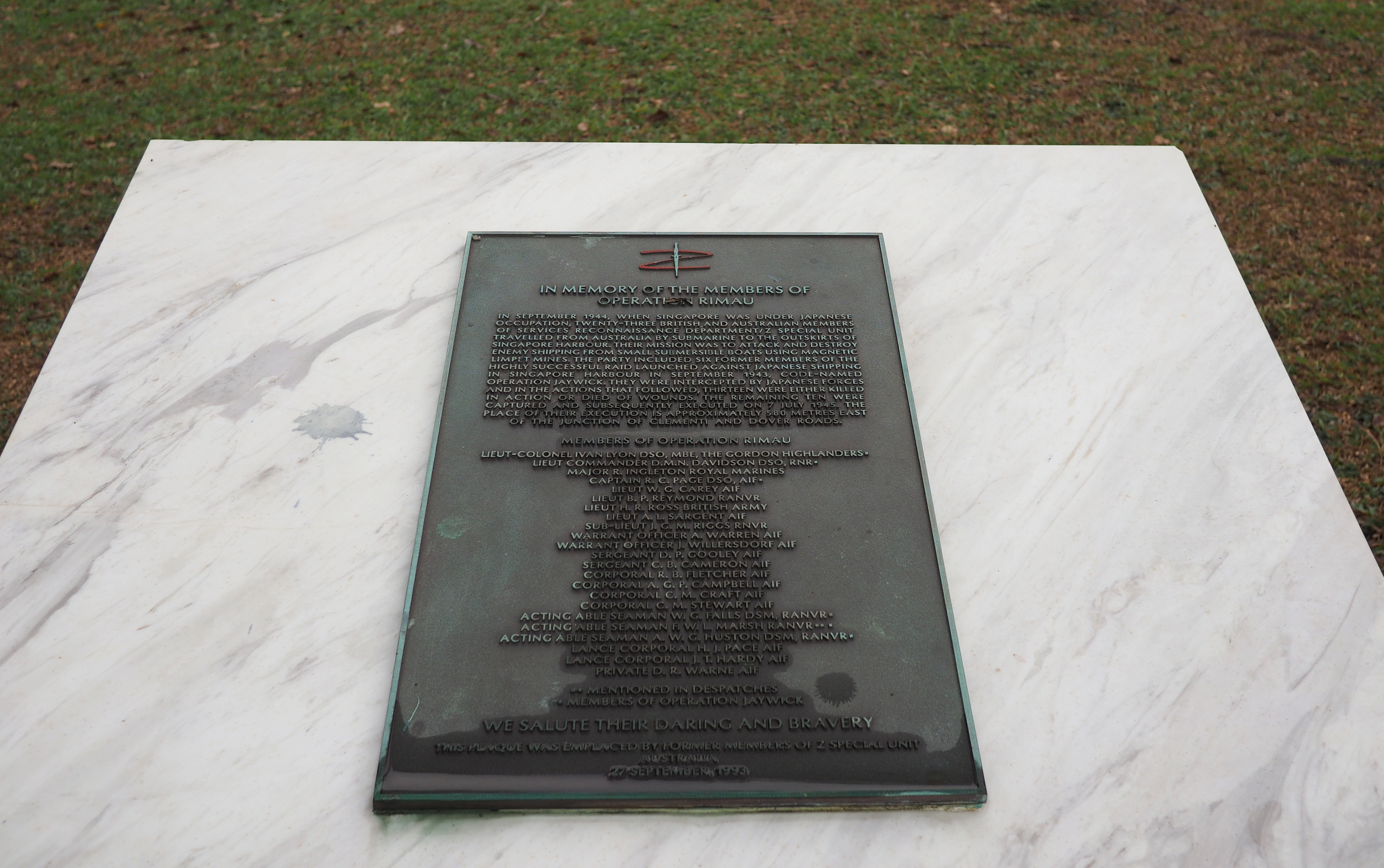
The memorial to Operation Rimau outside the entrance to the Kranji War Memorial

In all, eleven members of the contingent were captured and brought to Outram Road Prison in Singapore. One commando, Marsh, died of malaria. During the imprisonment the men were tortured and provided starvation rations similar to those provided to other prisoners in the facility.

The Seventh Area Army initially accused the men of war crimes, alleging violations of international law. On 3 July 1945, the ten men were put on trial for perfidy and espionage. The trial was overseen by Colonel Masayoshi Towatari, Judicial Major Mitsuo Jifiku, and Major Miyoshi Hasada. Confessions to the crime of spying from the commandoes had been obtained under duress, as the men were tortured. It had previously been decided by the Japanese military judge that the men had been spies as they were not wearing uniforms, and thus could be executed without violating the laws of war. The men were not provided with defence lawyers, could not cross-examine witnesses, and were given poor translations.

In delivering their guilty verdict, the judges emphasised the bravery and honour of the Australian and British men. In his 2017 book Traitors, Australian author Frank Walker describes this as a flimsy attempt to avoid prosecution for war crimes from the Japanese military judges, as the trial was unfair and had a predetermined outcome.

Official Japanese records state that the ten men were beheaded at Pasir Panjang on 7 July 1945, approximately one month before World War II in the Pacific came to an end. Later evidence stated it took guards more than half an hour to execute the men, sometimes requiring two or three blows to complete beheading.

The men executed were

- Major Reginald Ingleton,
- Captain Robert Page,
- Lieutenant Albert Sargent,
- Lieutenant Walter Carey,
- Warrant Officer Alfred Warren,
- Sergeant David Gooley,
- Corporal Clair Stewart,
- Corporal Roland Fletcher,
- Able Seaman Walter Falls,
- Lance Corporal John Hardy

The bodies were dumped in three unmarked graves. Three months after the war's conclusion, Australian war crime investigators found the bodies of the Rimau men, and sought the prosecution of the judges and executioners for war crimes. However, advice from the British War Crimes command indicated that when one was tried and convicted under Japanese law, neither the court nor executioner could be regarded as war criminals, and "no hard and fast rule can be laid down as to what constitutes a fair trial". While General Seishirō Itagaki, the commanding officer of the Seventh Area Army who insisted on the execution of the Rimau men, was hanged for other war crimes, and the executioners would either commit suicide before trial or be given jail sentences for other offences, the judges Towatari, Jifiku, and Hasada were never put to trial in any fashion, and escaped justice for their role in the execution of the Rimau commandos.

Nineteen of the Rimau commandos, including Lyon, are buried at Kranji War Memorial in Singapore. The bodies of two men (Riggs and Cameron) were discovered on Merapas Island in 1993 with the help of locals present on the island at the time of their deaths, and transferred to Singapore for burial in August 1994. The Highest Honor (1982) is a semi-fictionalized Australian / Japanese television movie about the operation.
