= Leonard Siffleet =

Australian Army soldier (1916–1943)

Len Siffleet
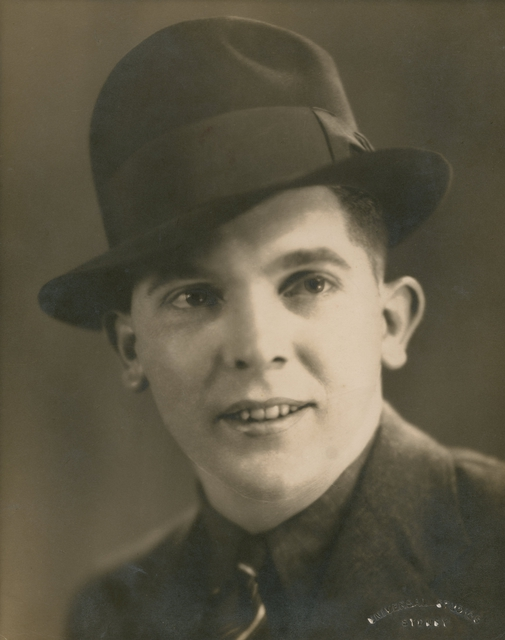
- Siffleet c. 1941
- Born: Leonard George Siffleet; 14 January 1916; Gunnedah, New South Wales, Australia
- Died: 24 October 1943 (aged 27); Aitape, Japanese-occupied New Guinea (Note: Today Sandaun Province, Papua New Guinea.)
- Military career
- Allegiance: Australia
- Branch: Australian Army
- Service years: 1940–1943
- Rank: Sergeant
- Units: Z Special Unit (1942–43); M Special Unit (1943)
- Conflicts: World War II; Pacific War; New Guinea campaign; Operation Whiting

Leonard George Siffleet (14 January 1916 – 24 October 1943) was an Australian commando of World War II. Born in Gunnedah, New South Wales, he joined the Second Australian Imperial Force in 1941, and by 1943 had reached the rank of sergeant. Posted to M Special Unit of the Services Reconnaissance Department, Siffleet was on a mission in Papua New Guinea when he and two Ambonese companions were captured by partisan tribesmen and handed over to the Japanese. All three men were interrogated, tortured and later beheaded. A photograph of Siffleet's impending execution became an enduring image of the war, and his identity was often confused with that of other servicemen who suffered a similar fate, in particular Flight Lieutenant Bill Newton.

== Early life ==
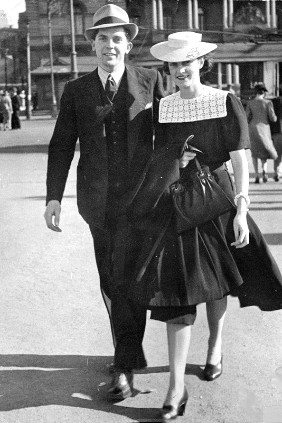
Siffleet and fiancée Clarice Lane, 1941

Leonard George Siffleet was born on 14 January 1916 in Gunnedah, New South Wales. The son of an itinerant worker of Dutch ancestry, his siblings included a sister and two brothers. Siffleet made his way to Sydney in the late 1930s, seeking to join the police force, but was prevented from doing so because of his eyesight. He was nevertheless called up for the militia in August 1940, and attached to a searchlight unit at RAAF Station Richmond.

Discharged from the militia after three months, Siffleet returned to his family to help look after his young brothers following their mother's death. He was working as a shop assistant when he enlisted in the Second Australian Imperial Force (AIF) in September 1941. Allotted to a signals company based at Ingleburn, New South Wales, he was reported absent without leave on two occasions; he was by this time engaged to Clarice Lane.

== New Guinea campaign ==
After training in radio communications at Melbourne Technical College, Siffleet volunteered for special operations in September 1942 and was posted to the Services Reconnaissance Department (SRD) of the Allied Intelligence Bureau in Melbourne. He joined Z Special Unit in October and was transferred to Cairns in Far North Queensland for further operational training. Assigned to the SRD's Dutch section as a radio operator, Siffleet was promoted to sergeant in May 1943. He moved across to M Special Unit the same month to take part in a mission to set up a coastwatching station in the hills behind Hollandia in Netherlands New Guinea. Described by Commander Eric Feldt, director of the Coastwatchers, as "the best type of N.C.O. of the A.I.F., young and competent", Siffleet joined a party led by Sergeant Thijs Staverman of the Royal Netherlands Navy, which included two Ambonese privates, H. Pattiwal and M. Reharing. Code-named Operation Whiting, their task was to work in concert with another group (Operation Locust), led by Lieutenant Jack Fryer.

Staverman's reconnaissance group commenced its mission in north-east New Guinea in July, trekking across mountainous terrain through August and September. At some point Staverman and Pattiwal separated from the others to undertake further exploration of the countryside, and were ambushed by a group of natives. Both were captured and reported as killed, but Pattiwal later escaped and rejoined Siffleet and Reharing. Siffleet signalled Fryer to warn him of the hostile natives and of Japanese patrols, indicating that he was preparing to burn his party's codes and bury its radio. No more was heard from them after early October. Clarice Lane (incorrectly addressed as "Clemice" Lane) had in the meantime received two letters from the Allied Intelligence Bureau in July and September, stating that Siffleet was "safe and well".

== Death and legacy ==
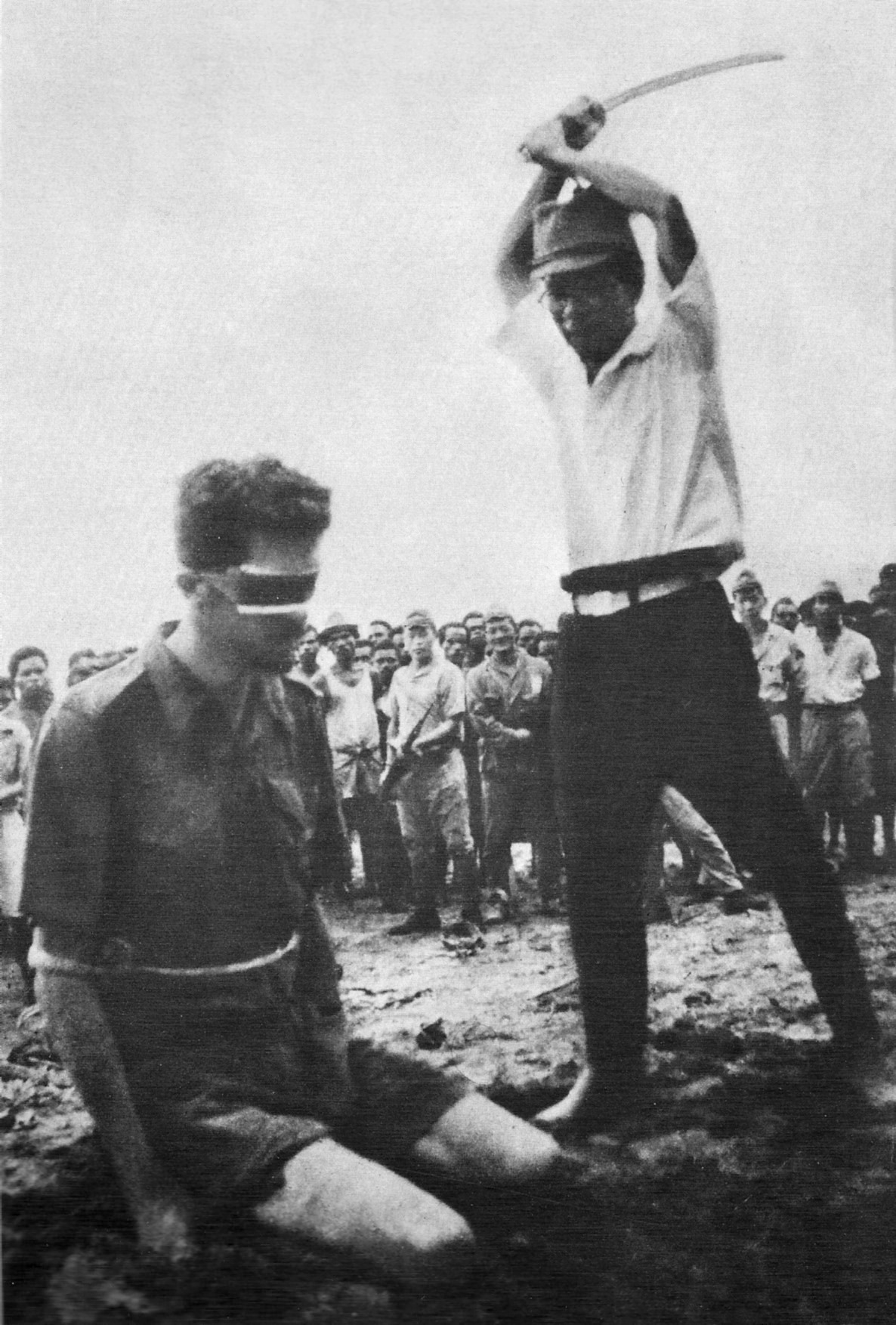
Sergeant Siffleet's execution at Aitape, 1943

After Pattiwal rejoined Siffleet and Reharing, they attempted to make their way to the Dutch border. They were ambushed by a hundred native villagers near Aitape and, after a brief melée during which Siffleet shot and wounded one of their attackers, the group was captured and handed over to the Japanese. Interrogated and tortured, the team was confined for approximately two weeks before being taken down to Aitape Beach on the afternoon of 24 October 1943. Bound and blindfolded, surrounded by Japanese and native onlookers, they were forced to the ground and executed by beheading, on the orders of Vice-Admiral Michiaki Kamada of the Imperial Japanese Navy. The Navy Civil Administrator who executed Siffleet, Yasuno Chikao, ordered a private to photograph him in the act. Chikao has been variously reported as having died before the end of the war, and as having been captured and sentenced to be hanged, with his sentence subsequently commuted to 10 years' imprisonment.

The photograph of Siffleet's execution was discovered on the body of a dead Japanese major near Hollandia by American troops in April 1944. It is believed to be the only surviving depiction of a western prisoner of war being executed by a Japanese soldier. The photo was published in Australian newspapers and in Life magazine but was thought to depict Flight Lieutenant Bill Newton, who had been captured in Salamaua, Papua New Guinea, and beheaded on 29 March 1943. It later went on display at the Australian War Memorial. Despite positive identification in 1945 of Siffleet as the soldier pictured, the image continues on occasion to be misidentified as Newton by some sources. Siffleet is commemorated on the Lae Memorial in Lae, Papua New Guinea, together with all other Commonwealth war dead from actions in the region who have no known grave. A memorial park commemorating Siffleet was also dedicated at Aitape in May 2015.

== Notes ==
Notes:
