= Operation Whiting =

1943 Allied WWII operation in New Guinea

Operation Whiting was a military operation by Dutch and Australian forces during World War II in New Guinea by M Special Unit. It ran in conjunction with Operation Locust, and resulted in the capture and execution of Leonard Siffleet in October 1943, producing one of the most famous photographs of the war.

== Mission ==
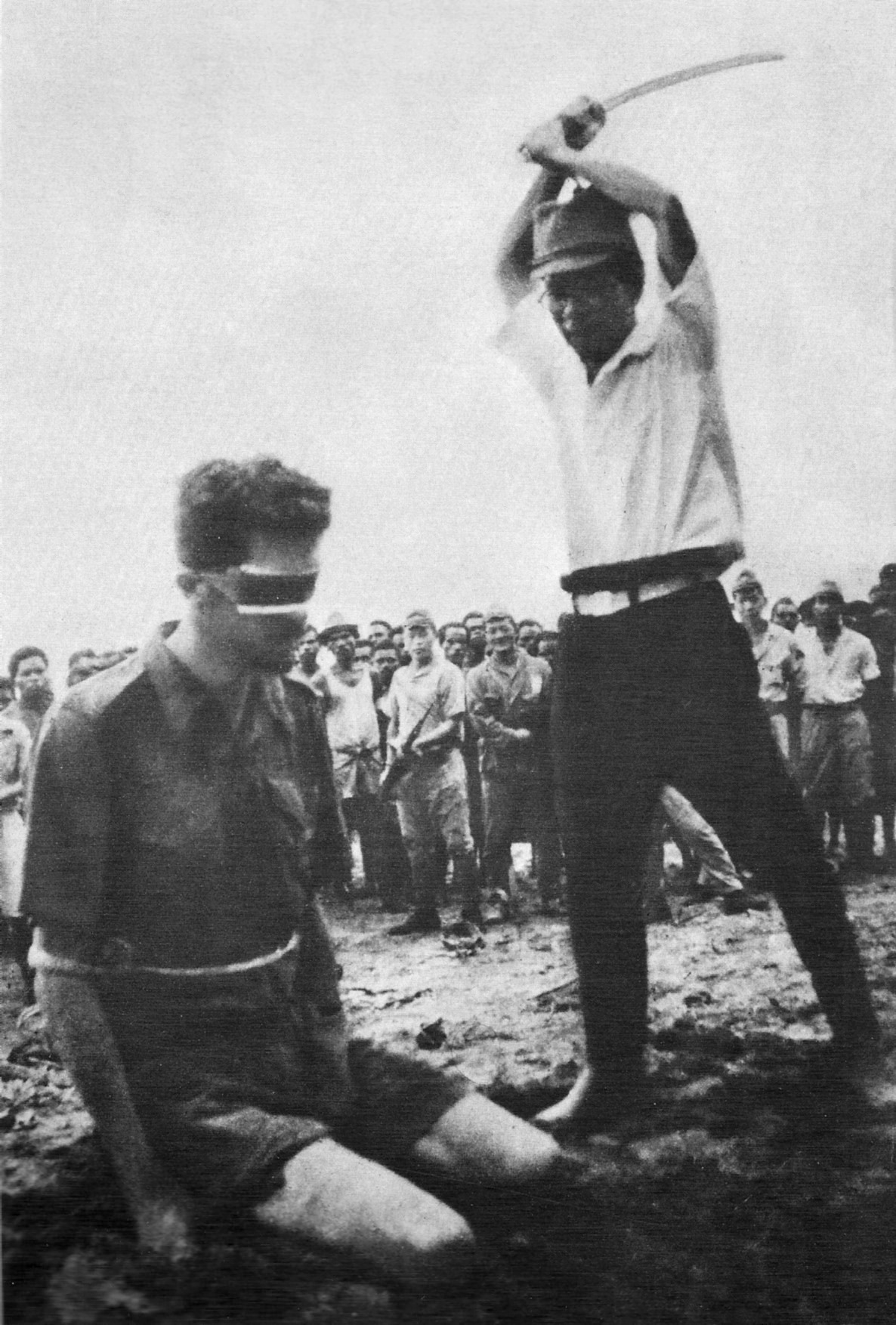
Sergeant Leonard Siffleet's execution in Aitape, 1943

The mission was undertaken by the Dutch section of the Inter-Allied Services Department (later known as NEFIS). Its aim was to establish a coast-watching station in the hills above Hollandia in Dutch New Guinea, recently occupied by the Japanese. It ran in conjunction with Operation Locust, which would focus on observation in New Guinea. The team consisted of Sergeant H.N. Staverman, Corporal D.J. Topman, two Dutch East Indies (Indonesian) privates, H. Pattiwal and M. Reharing, and radio operator Sergeant Len Siffleet, an Australian of Dutch descent.

In February 1943 the Locust and Whiting teams flew to Bena Bena and began a trek through the jungle to Aitape on the New Guinea coast. They reached Lumi airstrip on 14 June 1943, having travelled over 500 miles by foot and 230 miles by boat. On 9 July the Whiting party separated and headed off to Hollandia with 66 native carriers.

In mid-September the team had reached Aitape. A month later Staverman and Pattiwal were ambushed while on a reconnaissance mission and Staverman was killed. Pattiwal escaped back to camp to join the others. The three remaining patrol men attempted to escape south. During a meal break at Wantipi the men were surrounded by a group of more than 100 locals. Siffleet fired on the attackers, wounding one, and managed to break free. He was quickly caught and, along with his companions, was handed over to the Japanese. The men were interrogated and beaten then taken to a Japanese outpost at Malol. After two weeks the prisoners were transferred to Aitape.

=== Execution ===
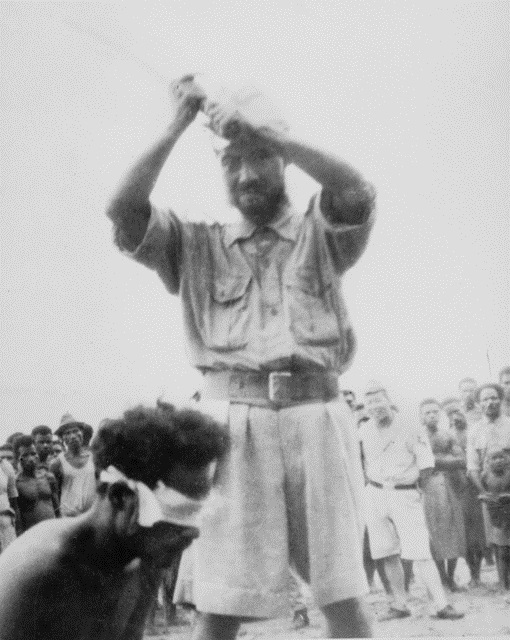
A photograph found on the body of a dead Japanese soldier showing Private (Pte) Reharin, member of the Netherlands East Indies (NEI) Forces wearing a blindfold about to be beheaded with a sword by Yunome Kunio

On 24 October 1943, around 15:00, Siffleet and two fellow prisoners were marched to Aitape Beach to a pre-dug hole in the sand. Kneeling before a crowd of Japanese and New Guinean onlookers and wearing blindfolds, the three prisoners were beheaded and buried. A photo of Sergeant Leonard G. Siffleet of M Special Unit being beheaded by a Japanese soldier, Yasuno Chikao, on 24 October 1943 shows him holding a sword over a haggard looking prisoner. It was found by American troops in 1944. The photo continues to be misrepresented as other victims of Japanese executions but its subject was positively identified as Siffleet in 1945.
