= Operation Tiger (Java) =

NEFIS covert infiltration missions on Japanese-occupied Java (1942–1943)

- Part of the Pacific War of World War II
Date	November 1942 – August 1943
Location	Java, Netherlands East Indies (now Indonesia)
Result	Most parties captured; heavy losses

Belligerents
Netherlands	Empire of Japan

Operation Tiger was a series of World War II covert reconnaissance and infiltration missions conducted by the Netherlands East Indies Forces Intelligence Service (NEFIS) on Japanese-occupied Java between late 1942 and 1943. Small parties were landed (typically by submarine) on Java’s south coast to collect intelligence and, where possible, establish clandestine contacts. Some Dutch submarines operating from Australia undertook covert intelligence tasks, including landing agents on the Javanese coast. Many of the Tiger parties were captured by the Japanese military police (Kempeitai); multiple participants were later executed.

== Background ==
After the fall of the Netherlands East Indies in early 1942, NEFIS was established in Australia to support Allied planning with intelligence from the Japanese-occupied archipelago. The Tiger missions formed part of NEFIS efforts to reinsert agents onto Java to gather information and rebuild clandestine reporting channels under occupation. Dutch archival inventories describe holdings that include material relating to NEFIS “parties” sent into occupied territory.

== Missions ==
The best-known missions were Tiger I–VI. Archival and secondary summaries generally agree on the broad pattern (small parties, landings on Java’s south coast, frequent capture), but some operational details—especially the numbering and identification of Tiger IV and Tiger V—are described differently across published accounts.

NEFIS Tiger missions (I–IV) landing/insertion areas on Java

=== Tiger I ===
A three-person party consisting of Lieutenant (sea) Wicher Bergsma (party leader), Soetarno (telegraphist) and J. Tapilatu (sailor) was landed at Prigi Bay (Teluk Prigi) on 30 November 1942. A biographical account states that Tiger I (and Tiger II) were put ashore from the submarine Hr. Ms. K XII. The party was captured; the group was imprisoned (including at Surabaya’s Boeboetang prison), sentenced to death and executed by firing squad on 1 December 1944 in Bodjonegoro.

=== Tiger II ===
Tiger II landed at Teluk Serang (Serang Bay) on the south coast of East Java on 27 November 1942. One narrative identifies the party as led by Lieutenant (sea) B. Brocx, accompanied by Raden Iswahjoedi Wirjomihardjo and Sadimoen/Sadimoer. The same account reports that Brocx and Sadimoen were executed, while Iswahjoedi survived.

=== Tiger III ===
Tiger III is described as a single-person insertion at Teluk Tapen (Tapen Bay) on 9 February 1943. The operative is identified as Daniel Lapod. A longer account (citing Dutch historiography) describes Lapod’s tasking as network-building and intelligence collection (including intended contacts in Malang and Surabaya), followed by capture and execution in Surabaya on 4 May 1943; burial is described at Ereveld Ancol (Jakarta).

=== Tiger IV ===
A summary in the National Archives of Australia “Special Operations – Australia” history lists Tiger IV as a single-person landing at Pang Pang Baai on 16 April 1943 and identifies the operative as Raden Mas Soejitno.

However, one secondary narrative places Tiger IV and Tiger V as separate landings in the Pangpang area in early May 1943 and reverses the identification of the operatives. (Note: One account describes Tiger V landing on 2 May 1943 and Tiger IV the following day in the Pangpang area near Banyuwangi; it identifies Tiger V as Raden Mas Soejitno and Tiger IV as the telegraphist Oentoeng, and notes that the latter was tasked to collect documents (e.g., currency and identity/travel papers) to support future infiltration.)

=== Tiger V ===
The National Archives of Australia compilation lists Tiger V as a single-person landing in April 1943, with no recovery reported. (See the note in the Tiger IV section regarding alternate numbering, dating and identification in some secondary accounts.) (Note: See the Tiger IV note for an alternate identification and early-May 1943 dating.)

=== Tiger VI ===
The National Archives of Australia compilation lists Tiger VI as a single-person landing in July 1943, and states that the operative was captured on 6 August. A later narrative identifies the operative as Srinojo Papilaja and associates the operation area with the Pangpang region.

== See also ==
- Netherlands East Indies Forces Intelligence Service
- Allied Intelligence Bureau
