= Operation Sunbaker =

- Part of South West Pacific theatre of World War II
Date	17 May 1944
Location	Near Dili, Timor
Result	Japanese victory

Belligerents
Australia	Empire of Japan

Commanders and leaders
F/O A. McL. Clark †	Unknown

Strength
15	Unknown

Casualties and losses
15 killed	Unknown

Operation Sunbaker was a military operation by the Services Reconnaissance Department of Australian Army in Timor in May 1945. The aim was to insert a team of operatives behind enemy lines. A B-24 Liberator A72-159 of 200 Flight RAAF taking the team was shot down on 17 May near Dili with the loss of all on board.

The dead were: AIRCRAFT CREW

- F/O T.T. Biltoft
- F/Lt. H.R. Campbell
- F/O H.J. Clark
- F/O H.A.J. Jones
- F/Lt. J.W. Rice
- F/O L.J. Brown
- F/O A. McL. Clark, DFM (captain)
- F/Sgt. C.A.R. Gamble
- F/O G.M. Manning, DFM
- Sgt. H. Riley

"Z" SPECIAL OPERATION MEMBERS

- Lt. A.F. Wilkins
- Sgt. K.H. Bell
- Cpl A.L. Lilya
- Cpl J.A. Nicol
- Sgt. K.M. Marshall

== Notes ==
- Silver, Lynette Ramsay (1990). The Heroes of Rimau: Unravelling the Mystery of One of World War II's Most Daring Raids Hardcover. Birchgrove, New South Wales: Sally Milner Publishing. ISBN 9781863510530.
- "The Official History of the Operations and Administration of] Special Operations - Australia [(SOA), also known as the Inter-Allied Services Department (ISD) and Services Reconnaissance Department (SRD)] Volume 2 - Part 1 page 53". National Archives of Australia. p. 131.
