= Combined Services Detailed Interrogation Centre, Brisbane =

Combined Services Detailed Interrogation Centre
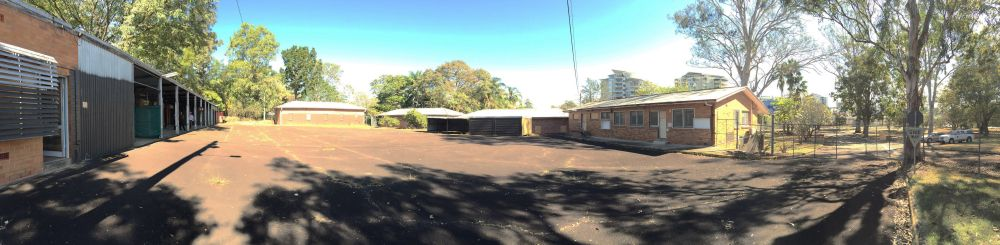
- View of Parade Ground, from the north-east, 2016

- Location within Queensland
- 27.5045°S 152.9754°E
- Location: 9 Lambert Road, Indooroopilly, City of Brisbane, Queensland, Australia

History
- Design period: 1939–1945 (World War II)
- Built: 1942–1960
- Built for: Australian Army

Queensland Heritage Register
- Official name: Combined Services Detailed Interrogation Centre (former); Allied Translator and Interpreter Section headquarters; Northern Command Provost Company headquarters; Witton Barracks
- Type: state heritage
- Designated: 14 October 2016
- Reference no.: 650030
- Type: Defence: Other – Defence
- Theme: Maintaining order: Defending the country
- Builders: Queensland Main Roads Commission

Combined Services Detailed Interrogation Centre is a heritage-listed former military building at 9 Lambert Road, Indooroopilly, City of Brisbane, Queensland, Australia. It was built from 1942 to 1943 by Queensland Main Roads Commission. It is also known as Allied Translator and Interpreter Section headquarters, Northern Command Provost Company headquarters, and Witton Barracks. It was added to the Queensland Heritage Register on 14 October 2016.

== History ==
Three brick and timber cell blocks (c. 1942-1943), and their related former exercise yard, located at 9 Lambert Street, Indooroopilly, Brisbane, are the last surviving purpose-built elements of the Combined Services Detailed Interrogation Centre, which was the headquarters of the Allied Translator and Interpreter Section (ATIS) from late 1942 to mid-1945. The facility was the only purpose-built World War II (WWII) interrogation centre for POWs in Australia. The later Q-Store and Office building (c. 1959–1960), and a Motorized Transport Cover (c. 1959–1960) were purpose-built infrastructure for the Australian Army's Northern Command Provost (military police) unit that occupied the site from 1951 to c. 1984.

Brisbane became an important supply base for the war in the Pacific after Japan entered World War II in December 1941. US General Douglas MacArthur, formally appointed Supreme Commander of Allied Forces in the South-West Pacific Area (SWPA) theatre on 18 April 1942, moved his General Headquarters (GHQ) SWPA from Melbourne to Brisbane on 20 July 1942, to prepare for a counter-offensive against the Japanese. The Imperial Japanese Navy had lost a number of aircraft carriers, and therefore much of its offensive strength, in the Battle of the Coral Sea (May 1942) and the Battle of Midway (June 1942); and during September 1942 the Imperial Japanese Army would be defeated, for the first time in the Pacific War, at the Battle of Milne Bay and on the Kokoda Track in Papua. As a result of these land battles, Japanese prisoners were sent back to Australia from September 1942. The first Japanese documents had been captured in an Australian commando raid on Salamaua, New Guinea, on 29 June 1942.

The Australian Military Forces (AMF, or Army) had begun Japanese language training in Melbourne in 1940, and Australian Japanese linguists were later sent to the Australian Advanced Land Headquarters, Brisbane, established by General Thomas Blamey (Allied Land Forces Commander) at the University of Queensland at St Lucia in August 1942. The large two storey timber residence Tighnabruaich, on 3.8 hectares (9.4 acres) of land on the bank of the Brisbane River at Indooroopilly, was requisitioned by the AMF on 17 August 1942, Requests for repairs and additions to the two residences on the site (Tighnabruaich and Witton House) also occurred in August 1942 and the Australians established the Combined Services Detailed Interrogation Centre there in early September 1942.

The site of the Interrogation Centre was once the estate of Henry Charles Stanley, Chief Engineer for Railways in Queensland, who built Tighnabruaich c. 1889–1892. Mr and Mrs HC Stanley were apparently living at Indooroopilly by early 1890. but Stanley did not purchase the site of Tighnabruiach until June 1891, and is first recorded as living in "Tighnabruaich" in January 1893. Tighnabruaich was designed by Henry's brother, the former Colonial Architect, Francis Drummond Greville Stanley. Development at Indooroopilly was limited until the Brisbane to Ipswich railway line opened to the locality in 1875. Indooroopilly developed as an elite suburb in the late 19th century, and a number of large villas, including Tighnabruaich, were later erected on the banks of the Brisbane River. Stanley lived at Tighnabruaich until c. 1901. In 1871 there was a population of 497 at Moggill, but only 286 at Indooroopilly. A railway bridge was constructed over the Brisbane River from Indooroopilly to Chelmer in 1876. An 1860s timber residence, Witton House, was moved onto the southwest corner of the Tighnabruaich estate by a later owner, Herbert Brealey Hemming, around 1915–16. After Hemming died on 8 March 1942 the estate was administered by Queensland Trustees Limited. The original site of Witton House (previously called Witton Manor) was upstream at what is Ambrose Treacy College in 2016. The McConnel family, of Cressbrook Station, bought Witton Manor in the early 1870s.

On 19 September 1942, the Allied Translator and Interpreter Section (ATIS), a joint US-Australian unit, was formed by MacArthur's Chief Intelligence Officer, Brigadier-General Charles A. Willoughby, and established its headquarters at the Interrogation Centre. McNaughton states that the ATIS "replaced" the Combined Services Detailed Interrogation Centre, but the Tighnabruaich property was later purchased by the Commonwealth for the Interrogation Centre. The ATIS was one of a number of intelligence organisations developed by General MacArthur's GHQ from April 1942 onwards, including the Central Bureau (code breaking), the Allied Geographical Section (terrain intelligence), Order of Battle Section (for information on enemy units), and the Allied Intelligence Bureau (AIB: propaganda, intelligence gathering, and commando raids or guerrilla warfare in Japanese-occupied territory). An AIB facility was established at the former site of Witton Manor, now the site of Ambrose Treacy College

The ATIS initially consisted of 14 Australian officers and three enlisted men, and nine US personnel. The latter included one Caucasian officer and eight Japanese American (Nisei) enlisted men who had completed a Japanese language course at the US Fourth Army Intelligence School in San Francisco on 1 May 1942; and who had arrived in Australia in June 1942. The American-born Nisei, whose families were removed from the US West Coast in early 1942 due to fears about the loyalty of Japanese Americans, were to prove invaluable to the Allied War effort. "The Nisei learned to use their knowledge of Japanese culture and psychology to elicit information through indirect questioning. They discovered that compassionate treatment worked wonders. Their captives, expecting torture and death, were at first astonished, then grateful. Any recalcitrant prisoner needed only to hear that authorities would notify his family ... that he had been captured alive. The implied disgrace could usually convince him to co-operate". The first Nisei combat units were formed in the US in early 1943, thanks to the earlier work of the Nisei translators in demonstrating their loyalty and effectiveness.

The ATIS was formed into four units, with the Nisei attached to GHQ; the other sections were Allied Naval Forces, Allied Land Forces, and Allied Air Forces, and all were accommodated at the Tighnabruaich property. The Tighnabruaich residence was used for senior officers' accommodation and offices, while Witton House became the Sergeants' mess. The Nisei enlisted men soon moved into tents at a property directly across the river (Neilson House on Rosebery Terrace, since demolished).

The ATIS headquarters at Tighnabruaich became the primary interrogation centre for enemy POWs in Australia. Other POW sites in Australia were POW Camps for large numbers of prisoners, whereas the cell blocks at the Interrogation Centre were built as temporary holding cells for small numbers of POWs awaiting interrogation.

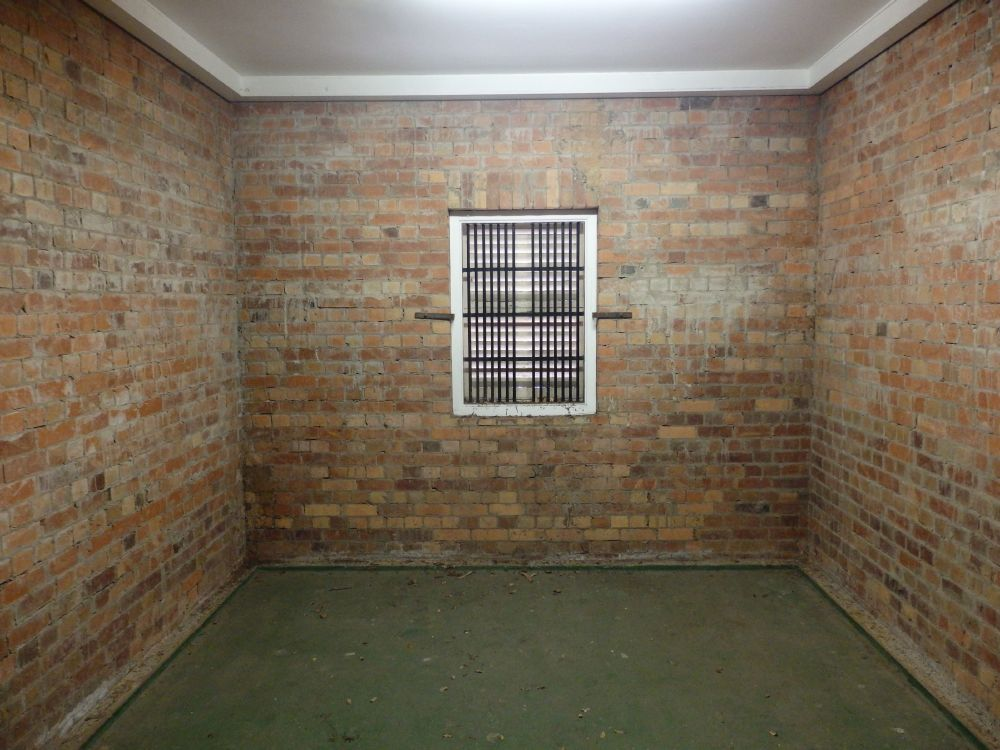
Easternmost cell in the southern cell block, 2016

With a capacity to accommodate 15 prisoners, the three cell blocks, in a compound surrounded by barbed wire, were constructed in late 1942 to early 1943. Each of the blocks included five cells linked by an adjacent passageway running the length of the block, and two ancillary rooms in a section on the opposite side of the passageway. Based on a 1958 inventory of room contents, the larger ancillary room (with a hot water cylinder) was probably a guard room, and the smaller a bathroom.

The construction of the cell blocks was kept a closely guarded secret. An Allied Works Council (AWC) meeting in early December 1942 merely noted a requisition for £2000 of alterations and additions to "three premises" at "ATIS Indooroopilly". The work was allocated to Mr Holt, Supervising Engineer of the Bridge Board, with the order lodged on the Main Roads Commission and a time of completion of six weeks. The project "Indooroopilly, GHQ, 3 special buildings" was also included in a list of requisitions to January 1943, with the handwritten annotation "Detailed Interrogation Centre". A Department of the Army minute paper from late January 1943 reported that "brick buildings of substantial design are being erected at Indooroopilly...for the Department of the Army on a site adjoining the railway station" with a hand written annotation noting that "this is the ATIS GHQ project for interrogation". A later minute paper stated that "the project referred to is an urgent vital operational one, comprising brick buildings erected to special designs produced by an overseas officer for the purpose of housing a GHQ Centre, and is of such a highly secret nature that only a very few senior intelligence officers were permitted to view the plans".

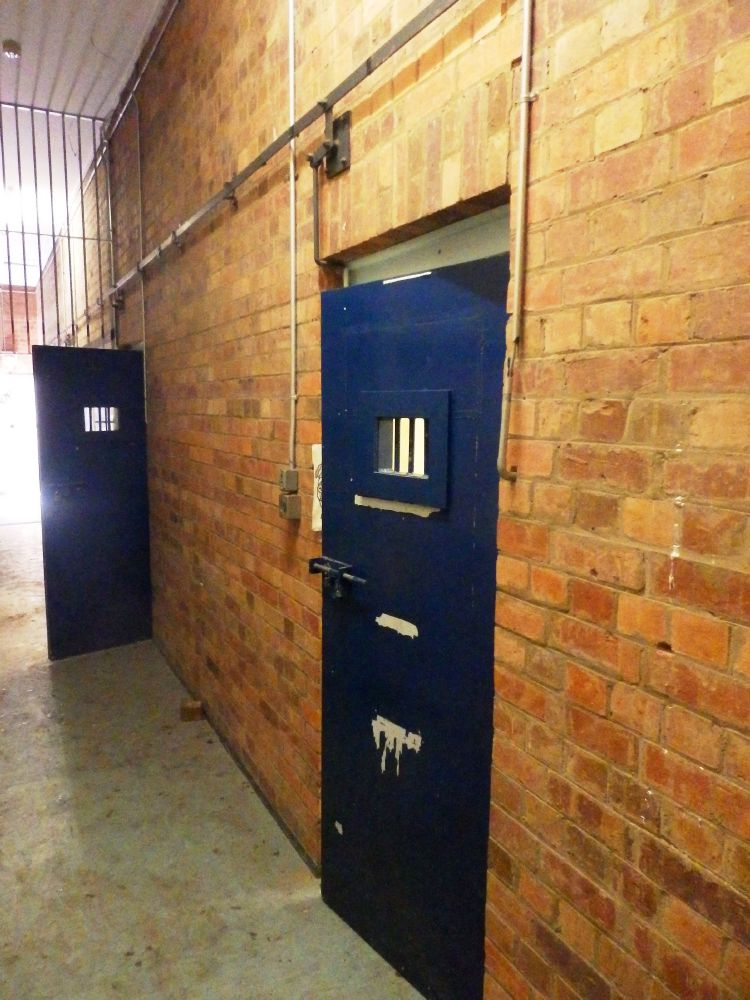
2nd cell from the south-west, western (central) cell block, 2016

The prisoners at the Interrogation Centre were held under tight security. The POWs in the cell blocks were guarded by troops from the Australian 1st Garrison Battalion, and were sent to the Interrogation Centre from the Gaythorne POW Transit Camp. "A small, dirt exercise yard was located within the barbed wire enclosure. There was only one Entry Point into the Prisoners" Compound. POWs were marched through one barbed wire gate into a small holding pen. They remained inside this pen until one gate was closed and locked. Then the other gate was opened to allow them to either exit or enter the Prisoners' Compound'. The Gaythorne camp (now replaced by housing) was located south of today's Bliss Street, Gaythorne, to the south and west of the south end of Newman Street. It included a block with 6 cells in a detention compound, located southeast of the south end of Ernest Street. The presence of Japanese POWs so near to Brisbane homes was kept a secret from locals. Once interrogation was completed, the POWs were returned to Gaythorne prior to being placed on a train and sent to POW Camps in New South Wales or Victoria. There was one death of a POW at the Interrogation Centre in 1943, when Private Kingo Yamashita of the Imperial Japanese Army hung himself in his cell after interrogation.

POWs of other nationalities were also questioned at the Interrogation Centre. These included German crew members of the blockade-runner MV Ramses (a cargo ship attempting to deliver rubber from Japan to German-occupied France), scuttled in the Indian Ocean by HMAS Adelaide on 28 November 1942; and the submarine U-168, sunk in the Indian Ocean on 6 October 1944. Interrogation of captured Indonesians, or translation of documents written in the Malay languages of the East Indies, was undertaken by the Netherlands East Indies Forces Intelligence Service (NEFIS).

In its first month of operation the ATIS, which was a polyglot unit including Americans, Australians, Canadians, British, Chinese, White Russians, and East Indies Netherlanders, processed 1000 captured Japanese documents, translated 90, and interrogated seven prisoners, the first Japanese POWs (captured at Normanby Island near Milne Bay) reaching Brisbane on 30 September 1942. The ATIS released its first spot report on 1 November. By 27 December 1942, Allied units in New Guinea had sent back 1100 documents for translation, and during the war the ATIS produced research reports on various topics, including war crimes.

Other important work conducted by ATIS translators at the Interrogation Centre included the breaking of the Japanese Army's codes in 1943 (after the capture of codebooks from the Japanese Army's 20th Division) and the translation of a captured Japanese officers' list that allowed the Allies to compile a Japanese Order of Battle. In May 1944, a captured Japanese plan ('Z' Plan) for concentrating the Japanese Combined Fleet for a decisive final battle with the US Pacific Fleet, assisted by land-based aircraft, was translated at the Interrogation Centre just before the Battle of the Philippine Sea in June 1944. The largest aircraft carrier battle in history, it was won by the US, with crippling losses of Japanese aircraft.

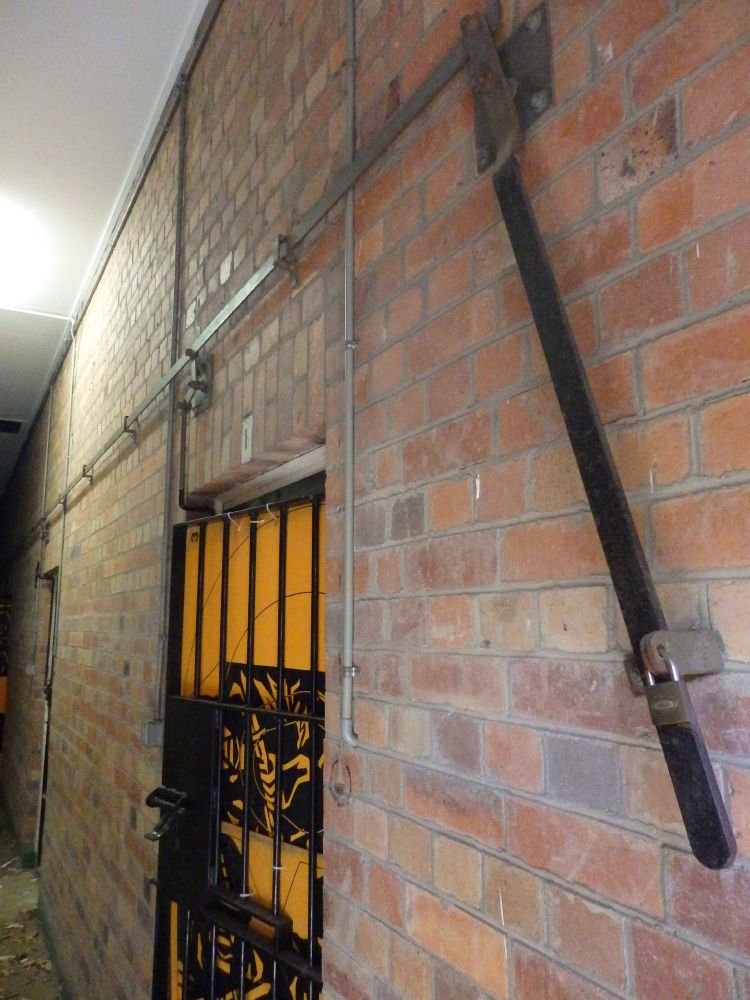
Door release and locking mechanism, southern cell block, 2016

The cell blocks are the only remaining purpose-built elements of the Interrogation Centre. Wartime site plans do not show the buildings within the prisoners' compound. One plan states the "Plans of buildings within compound are secret and unobtainable. Buildings are partly of brick". By April 1944 the complex had a prisoners' compound, east of Witton House; four "Masonite huts" south of Witton House, and eight along the boundary with the railway line, north of Witton House; a former stable just east of the prisoners' compound, used as a QM (Quartermaster's) store; four OR (Other Ranks) quarters northeast of the prisoners' compound, with showers and latrines to the northeast of the quarters, a mess hall and kitchen to the west, and ablutions and latrines to the south; a car ramp and petrol store further north near Lambert Road; an orderly room northwest of the circular driveway to Tighnabruaich; a translating building southeast of the driveway (built over tennis courts); plus a building just west of Tighnabruaich (possibly the interrogation building), and five buildings east of Tighnabruaich and the translating building. Of the WWII buildings at the facility, only the cell blocks were made of brick.

More buildings were added, and some were removed, between 1944 and 1946. The layout of the prisoner's compound – with three cell blocks, two small buildings to the north and one small building to the southwest – is visible in a 1946 aerial. By this time the Masonite huts had gone; there was a new building south of the QM store, and there were three additional buildings east of Tighnabruaich and the translating building. The buildings of the prisoners' compound are finally shown on a 1948 plan. The latter shows that by 1948 small lean-to porches existed at the north end of the western section of the western (north and central) cell blocks; and at the west end of the southern section of the southern cell block. All of the WWII additions to the site, apart from the three cell blocks, were gradually removed by the late 1950s. A c. 1950 plan indicates that some WWII buildings had already been removed. More were sold in 1957–58 (NAA: J56, QL470: "Indooroopilly – ex-interrogation centre – Tignabruiach. Wilton House – Residence Northern Command" (1943–1958)), and all were gone by 1959. Although the c. 1950 plan is labelled "Indooroopilly barracks", this term does not seem to be used in any other files or plans from the 1950s to the 1970s.

The Interrogation Centre was officially acquired by the Australian Government on 26 April 1945, Ownership was transferred to the Commonwealth on 13 June, registered 7 January 1946 and subsequently a variety of military units were accommodated there. In July, the ATIS left and until the end of the war the site was the barracks for No.2 Australian Women's Army Service (AWAS), which was transferred from St Peter's Lutheran College on Indooroopilly Road. The site was then used as barracks for No.7 AWAS until July 1946, and was used as a personnel depot until 1949.

There were some changes to the use of the cell blocks in the immediate post-war period. An inventory of buildings at the former Interrogation Centre, dated December 1950, noted that the western (north) cell block was used as a Sergeants' mess, while the other two blocks were still cells. All cell blocks were 65 feet 6 inches (19.96 m) by 33 feet (10 m), while the western (north) block also had a small 4 feet 7 inches (1.40 m) by 3 feet 6 inches (1.07 m) timber annex (south of the western section).

In January 1951 Tighnabruaich became the official residence of the General of Command (GOC), Northern Command, Australian Army (later Commander 1st Division) - the house serving in this capacity until 1998. During this period a tradition was established whereby each resident general planted a tree on the property. In 1960 Northern Command, which was headquartered at Victoria Barracks in Brisbane, covered Queensland, some of northern New South Wales, and the Territory of Papua and New Guinea.

The Northern Command's Provost Platoon was also based at the former Interrogation Centre from 1951, with the WWII cell blocks being reused as a detention barracks. Instead of POWs, they would now hold Australian soldiers. Provost (military police) units supervised disciplinary regulations and also provided traffic control for other military units. After WWII the Australian Provost Corps had been reduced to one platoon in each of Queensland, Victoria and NSW, plus some units involved in the occupation of Japan. AMF military detention barracks in Queensland (including Grovely, Warwick and Charters Towers) were disbanded, and by 1948 Queensland's Northern Command Provost Platoon only held prisoners for short periods before they were transferred to Eastern Command detention barracks in NSW. It was renamed 1 Military Police Company in 1974.

However, the re-introduction of National Service in the 1951 meant that the provost platoons were expanded to company strength. Previous National Service schemes had operated from 1911–29 and 1939–1945, and the third National Service Scheme, initiated by the National Service Act 1951, was a result of the Cold War and conflict in South East Asia and Korea. The first call-up notice for compulsory military training of males turning 18 on or after 1 November 1950 was issued in April 1951. Between 1951 and the scheme's termination in 1959, 227,000 men were trained. A fourth National Service Scheme operated from 1964–72 with more than 63,000 men were conscripted, and over 19,000 served in Vietnam. The Provosts were kept busy dealing with offences by National Servicemen, and the Northern Command Provost Platoon was expanded to company strength in 1955.

A number of changes occurred to the former Interrogation Centre site during its use by the Provost Company. By 1958 the western (north) cell block was a lecture room and gymnasium, with four rooms, a passageway and the timber annex (for a water closet), while the other cell blocks retained their original layout of two ancillary rooms, a passageway and five cells. All three cell blocks were described as having hardwood and brick frames; concrete foundations and floors; walls of brick and tongue & groove vertical joint pine; caneite ceilings; and a corrugated asbestos cement roof. Linings in the western (north) cell block were hardboard and plywood; with brick, caneite, plywood and hardboard partitions; while the other two cell blocks had linings of plywood and partitions of brick and plywood. The location of timber annex to western (north) cell block is discernible in a 1948 plan.

New buildings were also added to the Provost headquarters at the former Interrogation Centre, the first being three prefabricated Riley Newsum residences, completed in 1952 and used as married quarters: two on the Lambert Road frontage of the site, and one on Clarence Street, east of the translating building. The married quarters buildings were later removed between 1997 and 2001. The translating building was removed in the 1950s, and its site reverted to being a tennis court.

Two more buildings (extant in 2016) were added to the Provost headquarters c. 1959–1960, forming a complex around the perimeter of the former POW exercise yard, which at some point was sealed with bitumen as a parade ground. The two new buildings are not on a September 1959 aerial, but are present on a December 1960 aerial photographs. The arrangement of buildings around a central parade ground is a characteristic of Australian Army barracks. One building was a Q-store (Quartermaster's store) and Office, built north of the exercise yard. This had a Q-Store at the west end, a security room (possibly a secure room for the Q-Store) and duty room (guard room), orderly room (administration office), investigation AWOL section, and rooms for the OC (Officer Commanding) and RSM (Regimental Sergeant Major) at the east end. In 1961 the Q-Store, highset on brick piers, was described as being 72 by 32 feet (21.9 by 9.8 m), with a corrugated galvanised iron roof; brick walls; hardwood and concrete floors; cement rendered lining; hardboard, brick and louvre partitions, and hardboard and FAC (Flat Asbestos Cement?) ceilings.

The second building was a Motor Transport (MT) Cover, constructed to the east of the exercise yard. It included an office and store room at the north end, 12 vehicle bays, and an oil store room at the south end. In 1961 the building was described as being 150 by 21 feet (45.7 by 6.4 m), with concrete foundations and floor; brick walls; hardwood posts; galvanised iron cliplock roof; some cement rendered lining; and some hardboard ceiling. Australia's Provost units initially used US Jeeps and Harley Davidson motorcycles after WWII, then later British Austin Champs and Land Rovers, and BSA B40 motorcycles.

A further addition was made to the Provost headquarters in 1967, when Witton House was demolished and replaced with a new two-storey brick Provost Company barracks (extant in 2016). The stained glass entrance fanlight from "Witton House" was included in the northern first floor entrance of the new barracks, which was officially opened in February 1968. The fanlight was removed by the military sometime prior to 2016.

There were other changes made to the complex in the 1960s and 1970s. Between 1961 and 1969 a new (brick) annex was built south of the western section of the western (north) cell block; and between 1969 and 1974 a new building (not extant in 2016) was located on the parade ground, running west–east near the western cell blocks. On a c. 1983 plan this is labelled an SIB (Special Investigations Branch) office. This was replaced by a steel-framed maintenance workshop, located east of and parallel to the western (north) cell block, c. 1986 (extant 2016). By 1974 the western (north) cell block was being used as a Q-Store, with the 1959–60 Q-store being used as offices. Between 1974 and 1997 a brick extension, for a strong room, was added to the north end of the western (north) cell block. Also in 1974, a timber interwar residence (not extant) was relocated from the Kelvin Grove Military Reserve to face Clarence Road to the east of Tighnabruaich. By 1979 the Provost headquarters was called "Witton Barracks".

Between 1951 and the 1980s the former Interrogation Centre had become "the major military police barracks in Queensland", and "to a large degree the area [had] been purpose-built as a military police installation". By 1979 there were two military police units based at the former Interrogation Centre, to provide support to Divisional units and the Military District, and to prevent, detect and investigate crimes within the army. The units totalled 112 personnel, 39 vehicles and 25 motorcycles, and the western (central) cell block was being used for "additional storage and office accommodation". There was a barrack block (the 1967 barracks) with accommodation and dining rooms for 22 all ranks, and a 16-man barrack block was being used as an office (presumably the 1970s SIB office). Tighnabruaich was now the residence of the Commander of the 1st Division, and the residence moved to the site in 1974 was used by the Commander of the 1st Military District.

The use of Witton Barracks by the military police declined from 1984. In January that year the facility was occupied by the 1 Military Police Company, and 9 Military Police Company, with 110 full-time and 52 half-time staff. However, 1 Military Police Company moved to new barracks accommodation at Enoggera in April 1984, and Witton Barracks was reduced to 30 full-time staff. In January 1981, 11 Military Police Platoon and 13 Military Police Platoon, from Sydney and Townsville respectively, had been relocated to Indooroopilly.

Later the Queensland University Regiment (an officer training unit of the Australian Army Reserve) took over use of Witton Barracks, occupying it until c. 2009–2011. No structures of cultural heritage significance were added to the former Interrogation Centre during this period.

In 1998, a 1.2-hectare (3.0-acre) block of land containing Tighnabruaich, and a 2,181-square-metre (23,480 sq ft) block around the Clarence Road residence, were subdivided from Witton Barracks and sold, reducing the site to 1.97 hectares (4.9 acres).

In 2016 the remainder of Witton Barracks was purchased by the Brisbane City Council. At that time the three WWII cell blocks survived at the former Interrogation Centre, along with the c. 1959-1960 Q-Store and MT Cover, the 1967 barracks block, and the 1980s steel-framed workshop. The barracks block and 1980s workshop are not considered to be of cultural heritage significance.

== Description ==
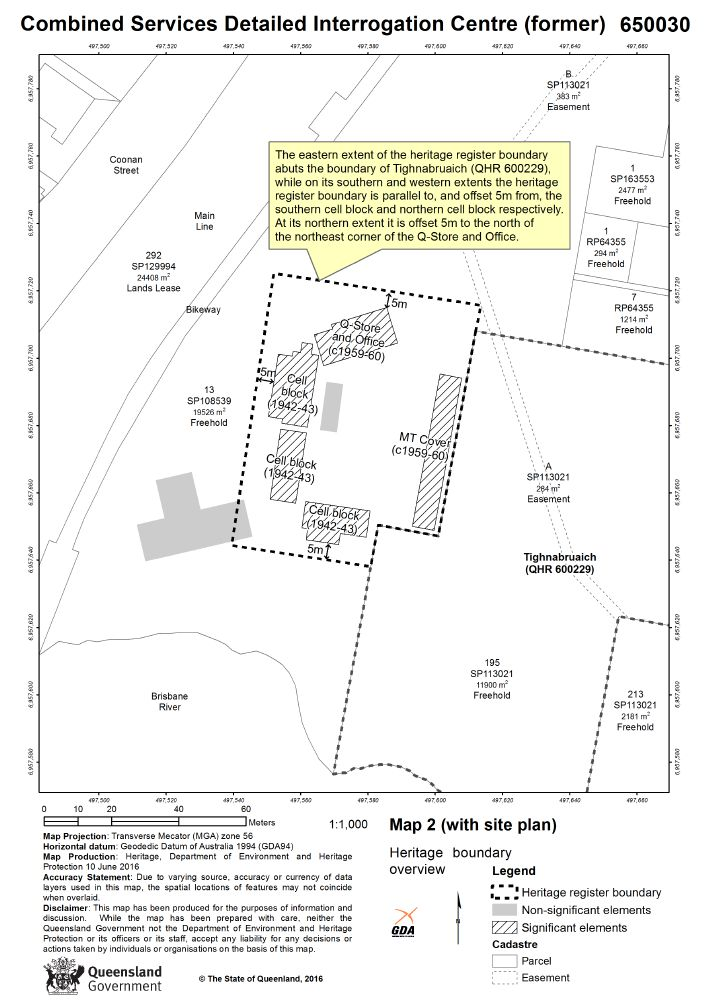
Site map, 2016

In 2016 the former Combined Services Detailed Interrogation Centre occupies a 1.95-hectare (4.8-acre) irregular-shaped terraced site, located on the northern bank of the Brisbane River in the suburb of Indooroopilly, Brisbane. The property is bounded by Lambert Street (north), a railway reserve (west), the Brisbane River (south), and residential properties (east), including Tighnabruaich. The area immediately around the former defence buildings, in the southern half of the site, is terraced, stepping up from west to east; and is accessed and set well back from Lambert Street to the north. The defence buildings are organised around a bitumen parade ground (previously a POW exercise yard) and includes a southern cell block (1942–43), two western cell blocks (central, 1942–43; northern, 1942–43), a northwestern Quartermaster's Store and Office (Q-Store; c. 1959–1960) and an eastern Motorised Transport (MT) Cover (c. 1959–1960).

=== Cell Blocks (1942–43) ===
The three cell blocks are of the same original design. Standing on a sloping site, the buildings step down from the southern cell block to the western (north) cell block. The buildings are all lowset, one storey, brick and timber structures, with corrugated metal-clad hip roofs, and spaced timber board eaves linings. They are approximately rectangular in plan. Most walls are facebrick, with the exception of those in the southwestern (western cell blocks) and southeastern (southern cell block) corners of the buildings, which are single-skin with external V-jointed (VJ) timber board cladding and internally exposed timber stud framing.

Each cell block originally comprised five cells, off a long passageway running the length of the building. On the opposite side of the passageway, and occupying almost half the length of each cell block, were two ancillary rooms - a bathroom and a (possible) guard room - and a lean-to entry porch. Most cells have brick walls, wide plaster cornices and wide concrete skirtings. The guard rooms and bathrooms generally have painted brick walls, narrow timber cornices and are free of skirting boards. Ceilings throughout all three of the blocks are recent plaster over VJ boards, and the floors are concrete slabs (some covered with recent linings).

Timber joinery is retained throughout the buildings, including timber-framed fixed louvre and awning windows. Most cells have a timber-framed, fixed timber louvre window, with vertical steel bars to the interior; and most windows to the guard room/bathroom sections have interior metal security grates.

Features not of cultural heritage significance include painted finishes to brickwork, tile and linoleum floor linings, flat sheeting lining some cell walls, fibre cement sheeting, modern bathroom fixtures, plywood boarding over windows and doors, wire mesh screens, and metal barred screens.

==== Southern Cell Block ====
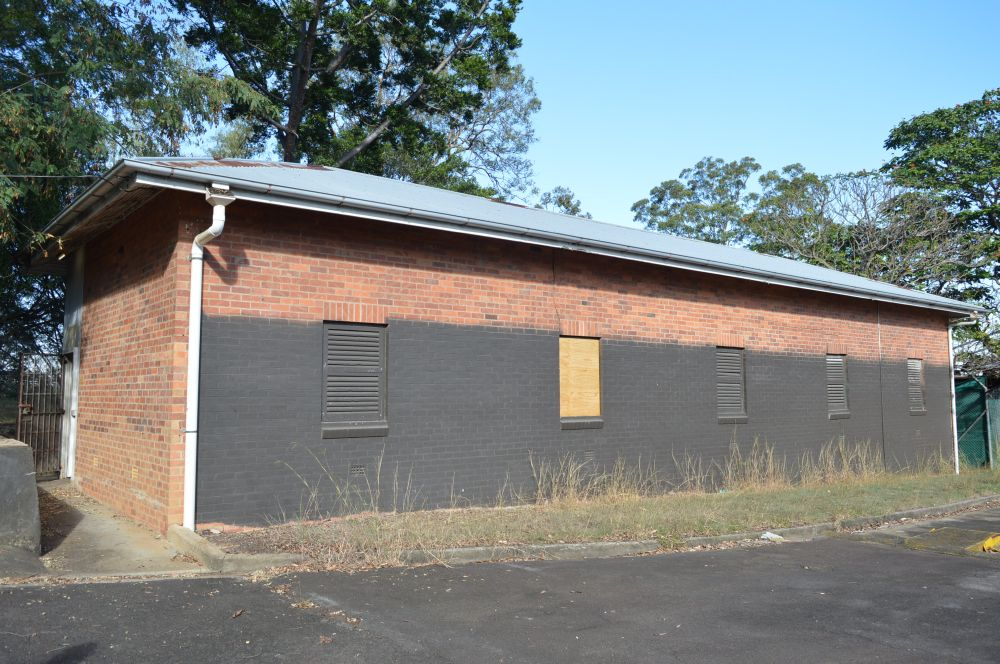
Southern cell block, 2016

The southern cell block is orientated on an east–west axis, and its floor level is aligned with the parade ground. The building is accessed via a ground-level footpath to the east and from a timber stair to the west, which both open into the long central passageway.

The facebrick walls of the cells have rough mortar joints, and above each cell door in the passageway is a painted number, listed from one to five (east to west). The entry porch has recently been enclosed with fibre cement sheeting (enclosing fabric is not of significance).

Metal grill doors secure the entrance to the building and each of the cells and retain original hardware including a locking device (lever) at the eastern entrance that connects to all the cell door locks.

==== Western (Central) Cell Block ====
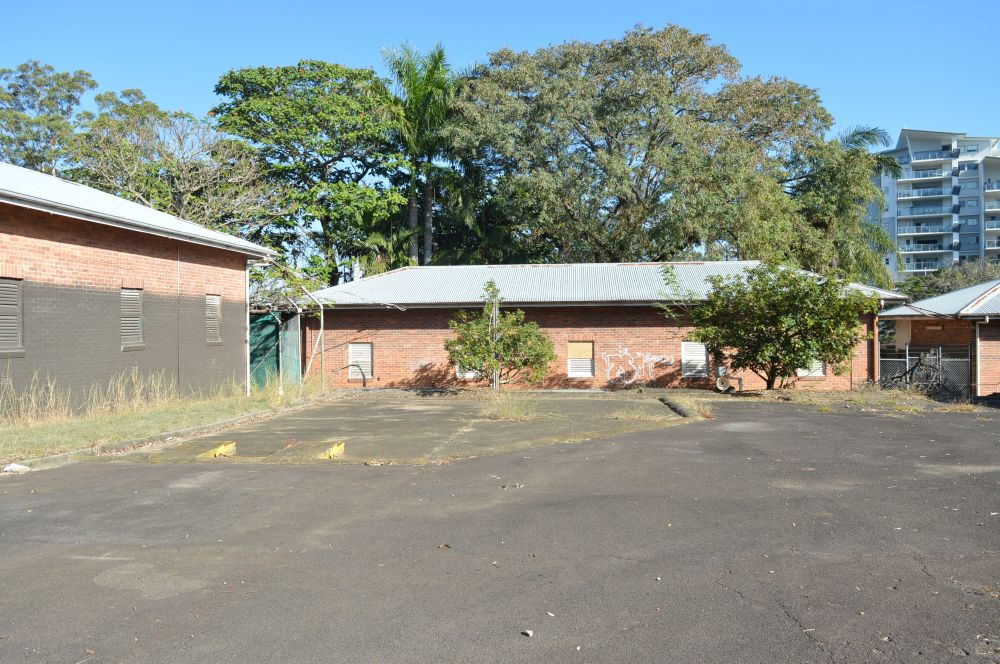
Western (central) cell block, 2016

Aligned on a north–south axis, the western (central) cell block stands downhill from the parade ground. It is accessed from a footpath to the south, a small concrete stair to the north and an entry porch to the northwest. A shade house (not of significance) is attached to the southern elevation.

Most of the cell walls and their skirtings have been painted. A large wall opening has been cut between the second- and third-most northern cells. The southern cell is lined with modern flat sheeting, which is aligned with the skirtings and has wide, rectangular cover strips.

The timber cell doors have metal grill observation openings at eye level. A metal locking mechanism running above the doors is retained.

==== Western (North) Cell Block ====
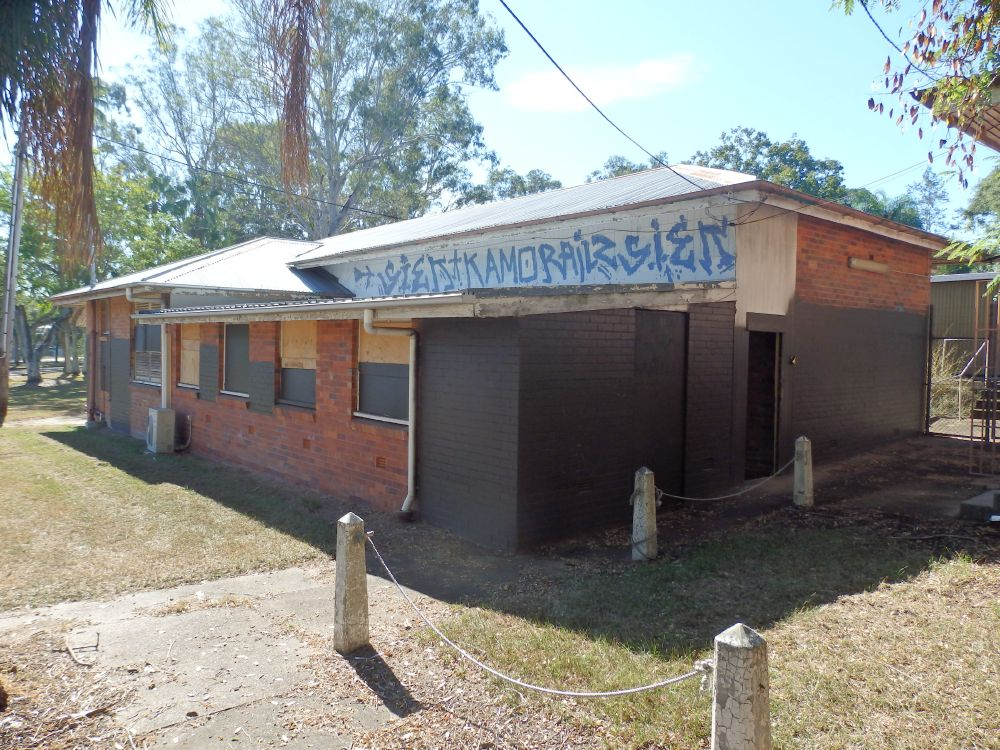
Western (north) block with 1960s brick annexe, 2016

The western (north) cell block is orientated on a north–south axis and its floor-level is slightly lower than that of the western (central) cell block. It is accessed from a footpath to the south and via the northwestern entry porch; the number 47 is painted above the entry porch's doorway. A single story, brick, skillion-roofed annex has been added to the southwest corner of the building; and a brick, skillion roofed strong room has been added north of the cells.

While walls that separated the four northernmost cells have been removed, stubs projecting from the eastern and western walls mark their former locations, enabling the original layout to be legible. A lightweight partition has replaced the original wall separating the southernmost cells, and includes a door and a low rectangular opening. All cell walls have been lined with recent flat sheeting (aligned with the skirtings) and finished with wide, rectangular cover strips. The cell windows do not have their original bars or timber louvres. The walls of the guard room/bathroom section are lined with flat sheeting with rounded cover strips. The two-room annex addition has painted brick and VJ timber board-lined walls.

VJ timber-lined boarded doors are located at the northern and southern entrances, within the annex and to the southern cell. Most cell doors are modern replacements and some have been removed completely.

=== Quartermaster's Store and Office (Q-Store, c. 1959–1960) ===
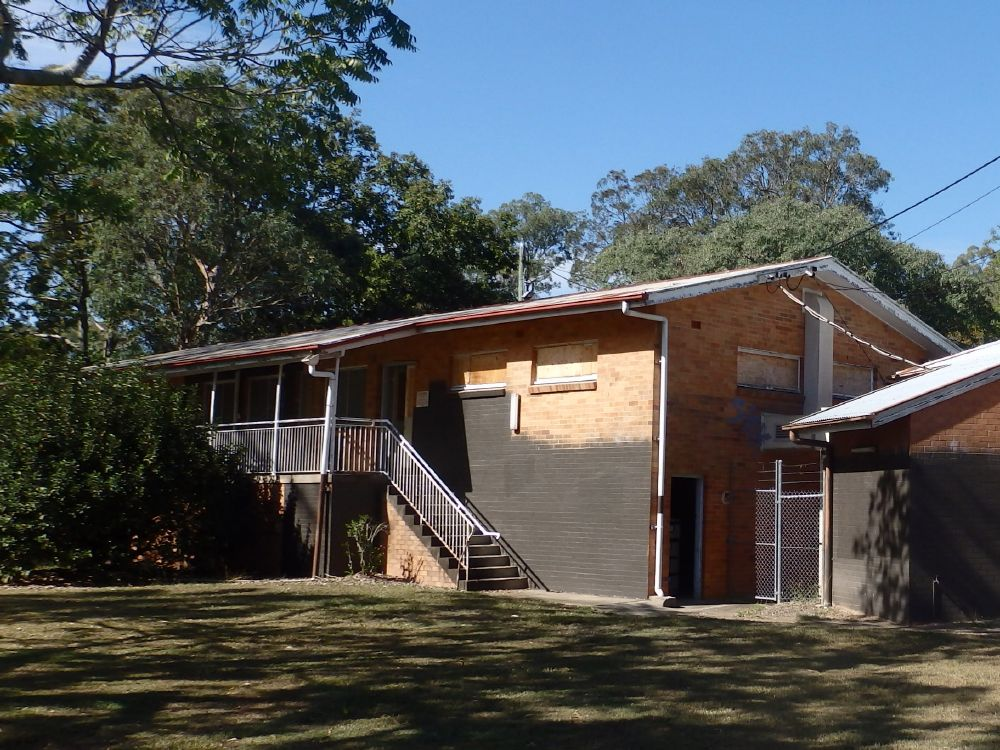
Quartermaster's Store and Offices, 2016

The Quartermaster's Store and Office (Q-Store) is rectangular in plan and is orientated to face northwest, with its main floor highset on the northwest elevation but level with the parade ground on its southeast elevation. The building is one-storey, cavity brick structure; supported on brick piers and sheltered by a corrugated metal-clad gable roof. All external walls are facebrick. The main entrances to the building are via a northwestern verandah, with additional access from the rear (southeast) – at ground level (eastern end) and via a concrete stair (western end).

Internally, the building is divided into two sections – offices to the northeast and store to the southwest - that are separated by a central Duty Room (north, entered via the verandah) and Security Office (south, entered through the store section). The office section is entered from the north through a central public corridor, which provides access to a northeastern Officer Commanding (OC) Office and northwestern Investigation Absent Without Leave (AWOL) Section Office; and terminates at a southwestern Orderly Room. A smaller corridor in the northern corner of the Orderly Room provides access to a southeastern Regimental Sergeant Major (RSM) Office, and a second door to the OC Office. The store section reads as its original, singular space with a timber partition west of the entrance door, although has recent, lightweight office partitions. All external walls are internally lined with plaster, and interior walls are lined with flat sheeting with rounded cover strips. All ceilings are lined with flat sheeting with rounded cover strips, and the timber floor boards are almost completely covered in modern linings. Marks in the floor lining at the entrance to the store section are indicative of the former location of a service counter.

The verandah has a concrete floor and a raked ceiling lined in flat sheets. It has metal circular posts with metal post-and-rail balustrades, and concrete stairs to the east and west.

The sub-floor area is accessible from the southwest. It is divided into three sections of the same proportions as the building's interior and verandah, with facebrick piers and walls dividing the spaces. A concrete plinth is located at the eastern end of the southwestern section.

Early timber joinery has been retained and includes casement and awning windows to the exterior, sliding windows to the verandah, and louvres (glass removed) within the interior. The OC and RSM offices are connected by a small, timber sliding service window. Interior metal security grills are attached to all windows in the store section. All doors are of timber; the entry doors are partially glazed and those to the office section are high waisted.

Elements that are not of cultural heritage significance include: lightweight partitions in the store section, linoleum floor linings, kitchenettes, plywood boarding over windows and doors, paint over external brickwork, and wire mesh and timber screens dividing the subfloor area.

=== Motor Transport (MT) Building (c. 1959–1960) ===
The Motor Transport Building is a brick and timber-framed structure with a concrete slab floor and a skillion roof clad in profiled-metal sheets. The building is rectangular in plan and is largely open for the provision for vehicle-parking in the centre, with brick enclosures at the northern and southern ends. A brick wall with protruding brick piers runs along the eastern side of the building and square timber posts, with timber bracing, hardwood post guards and metal feet, support the roof in the central section.

The northern enclosure includes an eastern and a western office, and the southern enclosure forms a dangerous goods store. The walls of the eastern office are of painted brickwork, while those in the western office are plaster. Timber skirtings and architraves within the western office are of a simple profile. Walls in the dangerous goods store are facebrick. The ceilings within all enclosures are lined with flat sheeting with rounded cover strips.

Early timber joinery retained in the building includes: timber-framed casements to the offices; a panelled timber door to the western office; timber-framed casements with wired glass and metal grates; and VJ-lined timber doors braced with metal strips to the dangerous goods store. External fixed timber louvre sunshades are attached to the eastern office's windows.

Non-significant elements include wire mesh and corrugated metal sheets that divide the central parking area, and plywood boarding over windows.

=== Former POW Exercise yard ===
A roughly rectangular parade ground (former POW exercise yard) is located between the cell blocks, Q-Store and MT Cover. It is a flattened surface that slightly slopes down from the MT Cover to the west. As an open area, it provides a visual link between the five buildings of cultural heritage significance.

=== Landscape Features within heritage register boundary ===
Early concrete retaining walls and concrete stairs survive in various locations within the cultural heritage boundary, including: to the east and south of the MT Cover, northeast and south of the Q-Store, between the western cell blocks, and between the southern cell block and MT Store.

== Heritage listing ==
Combined Services Detailed Interrogation Centre was listed on the Queensland Heritage Register on 14 October 2016 having satisfied the following criteria.

The place is important in demonstrating the evolution or pattern of Queensland's history.

The former Combined Services Detailed Interrogation Centre (Interrogation Centre) at Indooroopilly, which includes three brick and timber cell blocks (c. 1942-1943) and a related Prisoner of War (POW) exercise yard, is important surviving evidence of the only purpose-built World War II (WWII) facility in Australia for interrogating enemy POWs. As the headquarters of the joint United States-Australian Allied Translator and Interpreter Section (ATIS) from 1942–1945, the Interrogation Centre played an important part in Queensland, Australian, and global history. Military intelligence obtained from the POWs interrogated at the Interrogation Centre played an important part in the Allied war effort against Japan and also in investigating war crimes committed by Japanese forces.

The former Interrogation Centre also includes a brick Q-Store and Office and a brick Motor Transport Cover (both c. 1959-1960) which are important in demonstrating the use, from 1951, of the site as the headquarters of the Australian Army's Provost (military police) presence in Queensland. The 1950s expansion of the Provost Corps, and of the military police presence at the former Interrogation Centre, was due to the introduction of Australia's third National Service scheme (1951–59).

The place demonstrates rare, uncommon or endangered aspects of Queensland's cultural heritage.

The three cell blocks are the last surviving buildings of the former Interrogation Centre, the only purpose-built WWII interrogation centre for POWs in Australia. They are also unique as the only cell blocks constructed in Australia during WWII for holding enemy POWs, mainly Japanese POWs, prior to interrogation by the ATIS.

The place is important in demonstrating the principal characteristics of a particular class of cultural places.

The former Interrogation Centre demonstrates the characteristics of a military detention site. The centre accommodated enemy POWs during WWII, and detained Australian soldiers from 1951.

The cell blocks comprise five cells off a passageway running the length of each block, with an adjacent guard room and bathroom section. The southern cell block and western (central) cell block both retain their cell doors and barred windows, plus a locking mechanism above the cell doors along the passageway.

The former POW exercise yard still exists as an open space between the buildings, and was used after WWII as a parade ground. The arrangement of buildings around the parade ground is a characteristic of Australian Army barracks.

The Q-Store and Office retains all its original storage and office spaces, as does the 12-bay Motor Transport Cover. Both these buildings demonstrate the facilities (office and storage space, and vehicle garaging) required by a Provost unit to carry out its duties.

The place has a special association with the life or work of a particular person, group or organisation of importance in Queensland's history.

As the WWII headquarters of the ATIS, the former Interrogation Centre has a close association with an intelligence organisation that provided valuable information to the General Headquarters (GHQ) of US General Douglas MacArthur, during his direction of the war in the South-West Pacific Area (SWPA) theatre.
