= Michiaki Kamada =

Japanese officer, war criminal 1890-1947

- 鎌田 道章
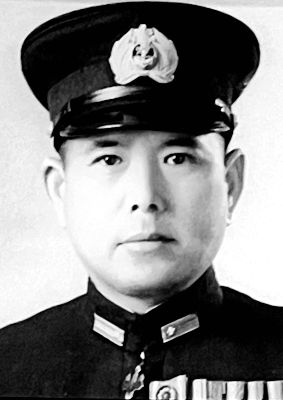
- Born: January 15, 1890; Ehime Prefecture, Japan
- Died: 18 October 1947 (aged 57); Pontianak, Dutch East Indies
- Cause of death: Execution by hanging
- Military career
- Allegiance: Empire of Japan
- Branch: Imperial Japanese Navy
- Service years: 1911–1945
- Rank: Vice Admiral
- Commands: 22nd Naval Special Base Force
- Conflicts: World War II; New Guinea Campaign; Borneo Campaign

Michiaki Kamada (鎌田 道章, Kamada Michiaki; 15 January 1890 – 18 October 1947) (surname often written as Kamata) was a vice-admiral of the Imperial Japanese Navy who saw service in the Pacific Theatre of World War II.

== Biography ==
Kamada was a native of Ehime prefecture in Shikoku island, Japan. He graduated from the 39th class of the Imperial Japanese Naval Academy in 1911, ranked 95th out of a class of 148. His classmates included future admirals Takeo Takagi, Chuichi Hara, Shigeyoshi Miwa, and Sadamichi Kajioka. He served his midshipman duty on the cruisers Aso and Iwate, and as a sub-lieutenant on the battleship Shikishima, cruiser Izumo, battlecruiser Tsukuba and destroyer Katsura. He was promoted to lieutenant in 1918, serving first on the battleship Mutsu before being assigned to the survey ships Musashi and Yamato. He became chief gunnery officer on the battleship Ise in February 1924. After his promotion to lieutenant commander in December 1924, he served on the cruisers Kiso and Abukuma before receiving his first command — the destroyer Hozu — on 30 November 1929.

After his promotion to commander in December 1930, Kamada served as executive officer on the battleship Hiei from November 1934. He was promoted to captain in November 1935, and became captain of the cruiser Tenryu. He subsequently commanded the cruisers Izumo, Kako, Ashigara and Yubari. Appointed to the Imperial Japanese Navy General Staff from October 1940, he was stationed on Japanese-occupied Hainan island.

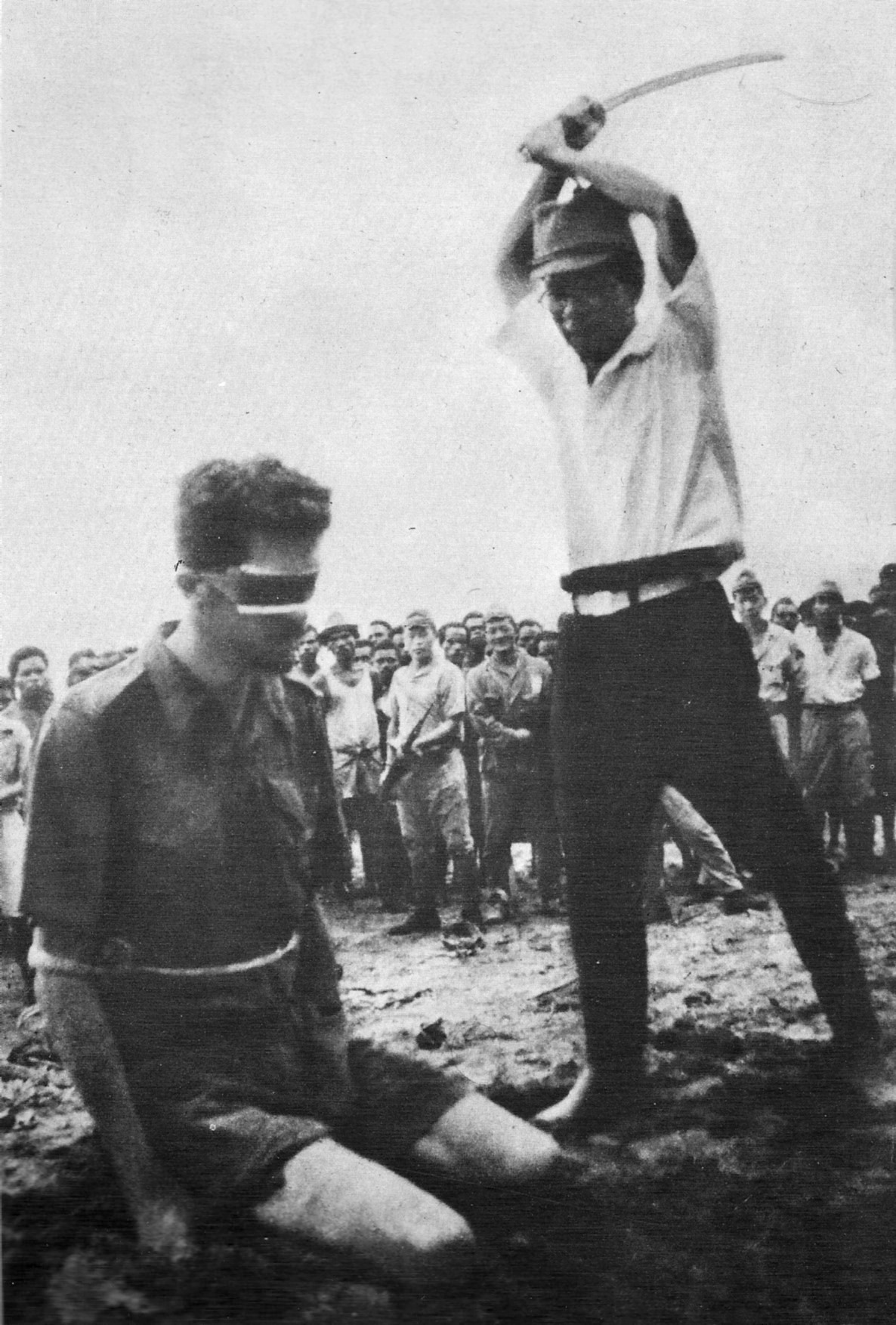
Sergeant Leonard Siffleet of M Special Unit being beheaded on Kamada's orders on 24 October 1943

Kamada was promoted to rear admiral on 15 October 1941. He served on the staff and commanded forces of the Japanese 8th Fleet in New Guinea from October 1942-December 1943. In October 1943 he ordered the executions of three Allied POWs, one of whom was Leonard Siffleet, the only Western POW killed by the Japanese during the war whose execution was caught on camera. On 23 August 1944, Kamada took command of Japanese naval forces, designated the 22nd Naval Special Base Force, based in Balikpapan, Borneo, making him the military governor of Dutch Borneo. Kamada's forces were subsequently involved in the Borneo Campaign of 1945. He was promoted to vice admiral on 1 May 1945.

=== Surrender and execution ===
Kamada surrendered his forces to Australian Major General Edward James Milford aboard HMAS Burdekin on 8 September 1945.

After the surrender of Japan, a Dutch military court in Pontianak convicted him of war crimes for the executions of 1,500 west Borneo natives in 1944 and the ill treatment of 2,000 Dutch POWs held on Flores Island. Kamada was sentenced to death and was executed by hanging on 18 October 1947.
