= Operation Prawn =

Dutch operation during World War 2

Operation Prawn was a World War II operation by the Netherlands East Indies Forces Intelligence Service in April 1944. On 20–22 April 1944 the submarine K XV lands the NEFIS shore party 'Prawn' (seven men) at the coast of Sorong, New Guinea.
