= Operation Finch =

Operations by the Services Reconnaissance in World War II

Operation Finch was a series of operations undertaken by the Services Reconnaissance Department in World War II.
