= Far Eastern Liaison Office =

Second World War Propaganda and Field Intelligence unit

The Far Eastern Liaison Office (FELO) was a Second World War Propaganda and Field Intelligence unit set up under the orders of the Allied Land Commander, General Sir Thomas Blamey, on 19 June 1942. FELO became one of four sections of the Allied Intelligence Bureau (AIB) which was established on 6 July 1942 to control and co-ordinate the activities of various intelligence organisations that had been set up after the outbreak of war with Japan.

== Objectives ==
Far Eastern Liaison Office was a propaganda organisation and was given a non-descriptive cover name to protect its real intelligence purpose. Its objectives were:

1. To lower the morale of the enemy forces and so impair their fighting efficiency.
2. To mislead the enemy regarding our military intentions.
3. To influence subject populations in enemy-occupied territories to impair the enemy's war effort and to assist Allied Forces.

== Methods ==
While some activity was common to both the Services Reconnaissance Department and FELO the general line of demarcation was that SRD was responsible for sabotage and physical operations while FELO was responsible for propaganda and misdirection.

FELO's methods, utilised in the S.W.P.A, were:

- Leaflets. Directed against enemy troops or to the inhabitants of enemy-occupied territories.
- Front Line Broadcast Units. Small detachments equipped with a radio, gramophone and amplifier, forward deployed to project specially selected talks and music into nearby enemy held areas to 'keep his mind occupied and prevent him from obtaining proper periods of relaxation.'
- Mobile Propaganda Units. These units worked with advanced forces with the objective of obtaining maximum native co-operation with Allied Troops.
- Agents. Agents worked in enemy-occupied territory, either under control of a European officer or independently.
- Misdirection. Use of rumours, leaflets, press and radio for the purpose of misleading the enemy as to military intentions.
- Radio. Special broadcasts to inhabitants of occupied countries which were picked up and broadcast by field parties.
- The collection of information and intelligence. Specifically to produce analysis that would be of use for psychological warfare purposes.

== Organisation ==
In its initial stages FELO was under the control of AIB but in September 1942 operational control was transferred to the three Australian Chiefs-of-Staff and the Senior Officer, Netherlands Forces. It was agreed that FELO's political activities would be controlled by the Minister for External Affairs through the Political Warfare Division of his department.

The personnel of FELO were formed from the Australian Services, and the Netherlands East Indies Forces Intelligence Service. The organisation, commanded by an executive with its headquarters located in Melbourne with elements stationed in Brisbane, consisted of eight operational sections:

- North Western Area
- Radio
- Research and Information
- Leaflet
- Japanese
- Store Equipment Technical Research
- Philippines
- North Eastern Area

Far from being deskbound professional influencers, FELO operatives performed some of the most hair-raising intelligence operations of the war. Personnel were heavily involved in field operations, often penetrating deep into Japanese-held territory in one or two man teams.

FELO was commanded by CDR J.C.R. Proud RANVR.

== Notable operations ==
Due to the difficulty of deconfliction with other AIB operations, FELO undertook several operations with the Services Reconnaissance Department towards the end of the war.

- "O" Mission
- "J" Mission, aka CRAB
