= Operation Walnut =

Allied World War II military operation

Operation Walnut was a military operation conducted by the Allies, notably the Netherlands East Indies Forces Intelligence Service, on the Aroe Islands during World War II. It took place in three phases:

- Walnut I - a party of two landed in July 1942 and returned in September
- Walnut II - party of two landed in February 1943 and captured August, presumed killed
- Walnut III - On 12 July 1943 a reconnaissance patrol consisting of ten, WALNUT III was inserted on Djieo, a small island north of Enoe Island, using Hoehn military folboats. Their fate is unknown, presumed killed.
