= Operation Locust =

- Part of World War II
- Location: New Guinea; 3°8′S 142°21′E
- Planned by: M Special Unit
- Commanded by: Jack Fryer
- Date: 21 January 1943
- Outcome: Some success
- Location within Papua New Guinea

Operation Locust was an operation by M Special Unit in New Guinea during World War II. It was held in conjunction with the better known Operation Whiting.

== Mission ==
The mission was led by Lieutenant Jack Fryer, with Lieutenant Guy Black, Lieutenant Harry Aiken, and Sergeant Les (Tas) Baillie as radio operator, plus local bearers. It involved an extensive trek through Japanese-occupied territory in New Guinea, leaving from Bena Bena on 21 January 1943. The trek went for six months until 14 June 1943 when they reached the Lumi airstrip in the Torricelli mountains. Locust established a base camp here and started observing Japanese. However the locals were very hostile and after the disaster of Operation Whiting a decision was made to withdraw. The patrol left on 27 November 1943 from Kokiabu on the Sepik River and flown to Port Moresby.

According to one account, "Locust did bring back with it some information on defences and dispositions, as well as sketches of inland routes, and that intelligence was subsequently of value to the Australian forces. But the reality was that by the time the Australians reached the Aitape area, they could have mounted aerial surveillance and done much the same job."
