= Caleb Grafton Roberts =

Australian civil engineer and army officer

- Born: 31 January 1898; Balmain, New South Wales, Australia
- Died: 23 November 1965 (aged 67); Kew, Victoria, Australia
- Military career
- Allegiance: United Kingdom & Australia
- Branch: British Army (1916–1919); Citizen Military Forces (1931–1944)
- Rank: Lieutenant; Colonel
- Commands: Allied Intelligence Bureau (1942–44)
- Conflicts: First World War; Russian Civil War; Second World War

Colonel Caleb Grafton Roberts MC (31 January 1898 – 23 November 1965) was an Australian civil engineer and army officer. Born in New South Wales, he was the son of English-born Australian artist Tom Roberts. Roberts relocated to London with his family in 1903 and joined the British Army during the First World War. He served as an officer of the Royal Engineers in the Palestine campaign and on the Western Front. After the war he fought in the 1919 North Russia intervention where he received a Military Cross for gallantry. After the war Roberts studied civil engineering at East London College, University of London. After graduation he joined the Ministry of Transport. After his marriage to Norah Joan Watson in 1922 he worked as a resident engineer on the rebuilding of the A127 road.

Roberts returned to Australia in 1925 and joined the Country Roads Board (CRB) in Victoria. He worked to introduce modern road construction and maintenance techniques to the state. Roberts joined the Citizen Military Forces in 1931 and upon the outbreak of the Second World War was appointed to the acting rank of Major. He soon afterwards transferred from the engineering branch to the Australian Army Intelligence Corps. Roberts was appointed colonel and director of military intelligence in 1942. He was controller of the Allied Intelligence Bureau, working within South West Pacific Area command. Roberts was responsible for espionage, propaganda and guerrilla warfare across a wide area and found the task of directing an international staff with varying motives difficult. Roberts relinquished the appointment in 1944. He afterwards returned to the CRB, becoming their chief engineer. Roberts again sought to introduce modern planning and construction techniques. He also lectured at the University of Melbourne and the Swinburne Technical College. Roberts ended his career as chairman of the CRB.

== Early life and British Army service ==
Caleb Grafton Roberts was born in Balmain, New South Wales, on 31 January 1898. He was the only child of the English-born artist Tom Roberts and Elizabeth "Lillie" (née Williamson; 1860-1928), his Australian wife. The Roberts family relocated to Putney, London, in 1903. Caleb, known as "Ca", was educated at St Paul's School, an independent school in nearby Barnes. He was noted as being an enthusiastic sportsman as well as performing well academically.

Roberts attended the Royal Military Academy, Woolwich, the British Army's officer training centre for the technical corps. He received a commission as a second lieutenant in the Royal Engineers on 26 August 1916. He took part in the 1917 Palestine campaign and fought on the Western Front in 1917–1918. He was promoted to lieutenant in February 1918. After the war, in 1919 he took part in the North Russia intervention, a military action carried out by the Allies during the Russian Civil War. He was awarded a Military Cross for gallantry in this campaign. Roberts also played rugby union for the army. After Russia Roberts returned to England, where he resigned his commission on 24 December 1919, transferring to the General Reserve of Officers.

== Highways engineer ==
Roberts studied for a Bachelor of Science degree in civil engineering at East London College, University of London. One of his classmates there was William Glanville who later headed the Road Research Laboratory and was knighted for services to the industry. Roberts graduated in 1922 and was appointed an assistant engineer at the Ministry of Transport. Roberts married Norah Joan Watson, daughter of William Watson, curator of Kew Gardens, at St Anne's Church, Kew, in London on 30 September 1922. During Roberts' work as resident engineer on the rebuilding of the A127 road between London and Southend the couple lived at Billericay, Essex. They went on to have three sons.

Roberts sought to return to Australia and secured the promise of an interview with William Calder, chairman of the Country Roads Board (CRB) responsible for the major roads in Victoria. Roberts and his family departed for Melbourne in August 1925 and shortly after his arrival was appointed assistant highway engineer at the CRB. He was promoted to highway engineer in 1928. Roberts' work in this period included the introduction of more modern and less costly road construction techniques. He prepared the CRB's first 10-year highways plan in 1937.

== Second World War ==
Roberts joined the Citizen Military Forces as an engineer officer in 1931. He was appointed acting major and called up for active service on 25 September 1939, shortly after the outbreak of the Second World War. When called up Roberts was living in Kew, Victoria. In November he was transferred to the Australian Army Intelligence Corps. Roberts served at the army headquarters in Melbourne and in February 1942 was appointed director of military intelligence, receiving the temporary rank of colonel.

Roberts was appointed as controller of the Allied Intelligence Bureau (AIB), an international intelligence unit with Douglas MacArthur's South West Pacific Area command. The AIB was responsible for carrying out espionage and propaganda work in the region and also co-ordinated the activities of guerrilla fighters. The unit grew to more than 2,000 men, drawn from across the Allied nations. By 1944 Roberts was finding it difficult to manage the varying national interests and the strong personalities of some members of his unit. He relinquished his appointment at the AIB on 17 October 1944 and was placed on the supernumerary list. He was discharged from the army on 9 December 1944, with the permanent rank of lieutenant colonel.

== Return to the CRB ==
Roberts was appointed chief engineer of the CRB on 30 October 1944, at a time when the use of motor vehicles was rising rapidly. He visited the United States and the United Kingdom between June 1947 and January 1948 to investigate the latest road construction and maintenance techniques in use in those countries as well as recent road safety measures. He wrote a report on his findings which was regarded as a landmark in Australian highways engineering. It suggested improvements in planning, new traffic demand models, construction and maintenance techniques and training. Roberts also recommended that a national road research body be established and, with Louis Loder, wrote a report that led to the establishment of the Australian Road Research Board (ARRB).

Roberts lectured at the University of Melbourne and the Swinburne Technical College. He became deputy-chairman of the CRB in 1956 and chairman in July 1962. Roberts retired on 30 June 1963, though he was co-opted as an adviser to the ARRB. He died of coronary vascular disease on 23 November 1965 at Kew, Victoria. His cremated remains are scattered at the Springvale Botanical Cemetery, Springvale, Greater Dandenong City, Victoria, Australia.
