= HMAS Nyanie =

Auxiliary vessel of Royal Australian Navy

History

Australia
- Name: HMAS Nyanie

HMAS Nyanie (GPV 965) was an auxiliary vessel operated by the Royal Australian Navy (RAN) during the Second World War. She was commissioned on 6 July 1945. She was used by the Services Reconnaissance Department and was paid off in 1945, before being transferred to the Australian Army.
