= M Special Unit =

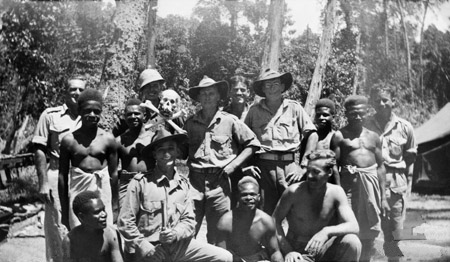
- Members of M Special Unit with New Guineans, 1945
- Active: 1943–45
- Country: Australia; Netherlands; New Zealand; United Kingdom
- Allegiance: Allies
- Branch: Military intelligence
- Part of: SRD, Allied Intelligence Bureau
- Engagements: Second World War: New Guinea campaign: Operation Locust; Operation Whiting

M Special Unit was a joint Allied special reconnaissance (special operations capable) unit, part of the Services Reconnaissance Department (SRD), in the South West Pacific theatre of the Second World War. A joint Australian, New Zealand, Dutch and British military intelligence unit, it saw action in New Guinea and the Solomon Islands between 1943–1945, against the Empire of Japan.

== History ==
In 1943, M Special Unit was formed as a successor to the Coastwatchers, with the role of the unit was focused upon gathering intelligence on Japanese shipping and troop movements. To achieve this mission, small teams were landed behind enemy lines by sea, air or land insertion. This was in contrast to its counterpart, Z Special Unit, which became well known for its direct-action commando-style raids.

A notable member of M Special Unit was Sergeant Leonard Siffleet, who was executed after being taken prisoner during Operation Whiting in 1943. A photograph of Siffleet in his last moments achieved iconic status following the war.

M Special Unit was disbanded at the end of the war on 10 November 1945.

== See also ==
- Z Special Unit
- Australian commandos
- Operation Locust
- Operation Whiting
