= William Glanville =

British civil engineer

Sir William Glanville
- Born: 1 February 1900; Willesden, Middlesex
- Died: 30 June 1976 (aged 76); Northwood, Middlesex
- Education: Queen Mary, University of London
- Spouse: Millicent Carr
- Children: one daughter and one son (John Glanville)
- Parent(s): Amelia and William Glanville
- Engineering career
- Discipline: Civil
- Institutions: Institution of Civil Engineers (president),

Sir William Henry Glanville CB CBE FRS (1 February 1900 – 30 June 1976) was a British civil engineer. During World War II he and the Road Research Laboratory were involved in important war work, developing temporary runways, beach analysis, and tank and aircraft design. He also worked on the explosives calculations and scale models used to develop the bouncing bombs used in the Dam Busters Raid.

He was widely recognised for his contributions to engineering and, amongst a string of professional awards, was appointed as a Commander of the Order of the British Empire (CBE), as a Companion of the Order of the Bath and knighted.

== Early life ==
William Glanville was born on 1 February 1900 in Willesden, Middlesex, the second child, and only son, of Amelia and William Glanville. His father was originally from Cornwall and worked as a builder. Known to his friends as Bill, he was educated at Kilburn Grammar School from 1911 to 1918. His did not distinguish himself at the school except in his ability in shooting, at which he represented the school in competitions at the National Rifle Association's ranges in Bisley, Surrey and won several prizes. Whilst at school he taught himself shorthand, on his own initiative. Glanville served briefly in the British Army during the final stages of the First World War. After demobilisation he applied to study civil engineering at East London College (now Queen Mary, University of London) in 1919 making use of a grant provided for the education of former servicemen. He excelled at university and graduated top of his year, with first class honours in 1922. One of his classmates was Caleb Grafton Roberts, who became chairman of the Country Roads Board in Australia.

== Building Research Station ==
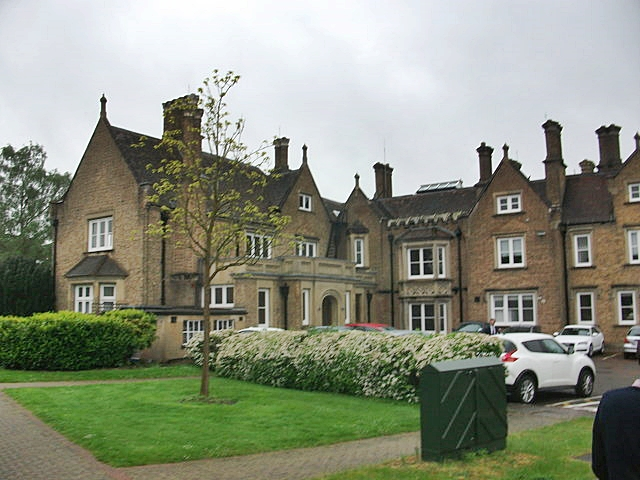
The BRS facility at Garston

Upon graduation Glanville entered employment as an engineering assistant at the Building Research Station (which would become the Building Research Establishment) in East Acton. Glanville was only the third person employed by the Department of Scientific and Industrial Research (DSIR) to undertake research work at the underfunded station which was established in April 1921. He became its second engineering assistant. The BRS was led by director Reginald Stradling, who held two doctorates and had also served during the war. The BRS was one of a number of research station within DSIR which had been set up during the First World War to develop industry in Britain to replace imports of essential goods which were threatened by the war.

Glanville's first investigation at the Building Research Station (BRS) was to study how the water permeability of concrete varied and, with Duff Abrams, was one of the first to attribute this primarily to the water-cement ratio and not to the type and proportions of aggregate used. He also found that concrete became much more impermeable when cured by immersion in water, compared with the more popular air curing method. He continued his work in this field, investigating the bond between concrete and steel reinforcement, shrinkage of the material and creep and flow under load. Glanville's work was among the first scientific research into reinforced concrete, the design and installation of which had previously been governed almost entirely by practical experience rather than scientific theory.

Glanville's became an associate member of the Institution of Civil Engineers in 1925. In 1925 the BRS moved to Garston near Watford. After the move Glanville's focus switched to development of new methods of testing building materials, designing and installing new testing equipment at the BRS and carrying out research on concrete, structural steel, brickwork and the acoustic properties of materials. His work on the creep and flow of concrete led to a PhD from the University of London in 1927. Glanville was appointed head of the BRS' engineering section ("Chief Engineer") in 1928. His responsibilities encompassed all of the BRS's engineering work including the management of its research, development of equipment and investigations of structural failures as well maintenance and expansion of the station. Glanville continued his own research into concrete and received, in 1930, a DSc degree from the University of London. In later life he reflected on this period of his career as his happiest and most professionally rewarding.

In 1931 he was consulted by London County Council on the drawing up of a code of practice for the use of reinforced concrete in buildings. The report, drawing heavily on Glanville's research, was published in 1933 and later incorporated into British Standards code 114. His research covered almost every aspect of concrete use in construction and included shrinkage stresses, creeping, and permeability as well as work on indeterminate structures, timber roofs, and curved bracing members. Some of his later work in the field focussed on continuous reinforced concrete beams and portal frame structures and he was the first to show that apparent increased in load-bearing capacity could result from creep in the concrete and plastic deformation of the reinforcing steel. Another of his later works was a study carried out for the Road Research Laboratory on the performance of reinforced concrete slabs in roads when exposed to static loads. Glanville was appointed a member of the ICE research sub-committee on reinforced concrete reservoirs in 1934. In the early 1930s he carried out research on the use of driven concrete piles, which had previously been little studied. Collaborating with Geoffrey Grime, W. W. Davies and the Federation of Civil Engineering Contractors he developed a means of estimating the amount of driving force a pile could be exposed to without damage. This involved a mixture of analytical work and practical experimentation on sites at the laboratory and across London. The team developed apparatus using piezo-electric strain gauges to measure dynamic stress during driving, the set-up was later adapted to measure blast pressures from explosions. The work helped provide guidance to designers and contractors on installing the piles in various ground conditions. There had previously been no method of determining if piles were suitable for the ground conditions before they were installed on site, leading to some dangerous failures of piles whilst being driven by heavy hammers.

Glanville's 1930 three-part paper Studies in reinforced concrete and further work he carried out in 1939 formed the basis for design codes for reinforced concrete structures which became British Standard CP114. Glanville, with W. L. Scott, wrote a handbook on the use of the code which has since been continually updated and remains a standard text for concrete design engineers. Glanville's last edition was published in 1950 with Scott (who died before publication) and F. G. Thomas of the BRS.

Glanville remained at the research station until 1936 when he was asked to become deputy director of the Road Research Laboratory (RRL) in Harmondsworth. The RRL had been founded just three years earlier. He became a full member of the ICE in 1934. He retained an interest in concrete as a material throughout the rest of his career.

== Road Research Laboratory ==
The RRL had been formed in 1933 with Stradling taking the directorship jointly with his previous role at the BRS. The RRL had been formed by the transfer of the Experimental Station of the Ministry of Transport to DSIR. The ministry had opposed this move and intervened to limit the RRL's research to the fields of materials and methodologies, research into traffic management and road safety was prohibited. Glanville was appointed deputy director and officer in charge after the previous appointee R. G. C. Batson resigned to take up the chair of engineering at Liverpool University. At the RRL Glanville took on an increasingly more administrative role, devolving research to his assistants, however he still found time to undertake a comprehensive study of the performance of concrete roads. He also established a section of the laboratory to work exclusively on soil mechanics, a subject which was beginning to come to the fore of building and infrastructure design. He was appointed assistant director of the RRL in 1936 and director in 1939. Glanville moved with the RRL to share facilities with the Radio Research Station during the Munich crisis of 1938 as the War Office took over their Harmondsworth facility. They returned to Harmondsworth shortly afterwards. Took on the directorship in April 1939 after Stradling resigned upon appointment as chief scientific officer to the Ministry of Home Security, which had been established to consider matters of air raid precautions as the Second World War loomed. Glanville insisted on the title being amended from Director of the Road Research Laboaratory to "Director of Road Research", as he believed his remit should encompass all roads research within the DSIR. Later that year a House of Lords select committee (led by Robert Munro, 1st Baron Alness) on road accidents recommended that road safety research body be established as a new board. Glanville sought to bring this within the RRL but disagreements between the Ministry of Transport and DSIR on how the committee's recommendations should be implemented meant that nothing was achieved before the Second World War broke out.

== War work ==
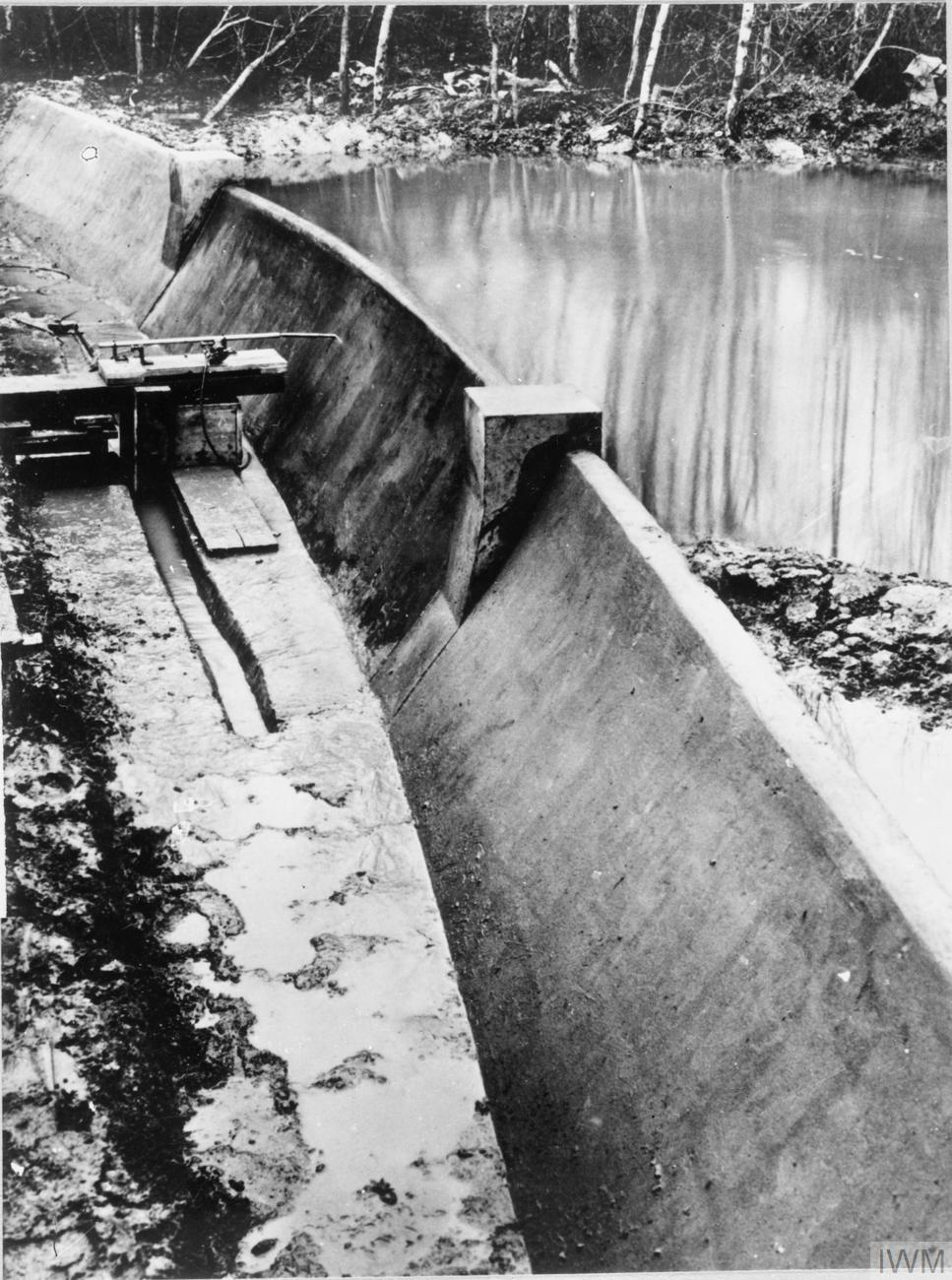
1:50 scale model of the Moehne Dam constructed at Garston to test the Operation Chastise explosives

At the outbreak of the Second World War in 1939 Glanville was put in charge of the research and experiments department of the Ministry of Home Security as chief scientific adviser at the Princes Risborough station. The station was situated here to avoid German air raids. A meeting called by Dr Edward Appleton, secretary of DSIR, decided that air raid precautions work of the BRS should be transferred to the RRL under Glanville's direction. He was granted authority to assign additional staff to the programme and also received staff from the BRS and the National Physical Laboratory. The RRL received additional work from the Ministry of Home Security, the Admiralty, the War Office, the Air Ministry, the Ministry of Aircraft Production, the Ministry of Supply and the Ministry of Defence and Glanville found that defence matters accounted for up to 70% of the department's work.

Glanville also acted as an advisor to the Air Ministry and the Ministry of Aircraft Production on the construction of concrete runways and specialised airfields. The latter included "Prefabricated Bituminised Surfacing" (PBS) made from bitumen-impregnated hessian laid over steel mesh which could act as a runway surface over swampy or otherwise difficult ground. These PBS airstrips had a service life of around four months and were easily transportable, in the course of the war 60 million square yards of PBS were manufactured in the UK, US and India. The soil section of the BRS, assisted by Glanville, was also responsible for the assessment and categorisation of European beaches prior to the Normandy Landings.

The soil section, which Glanville set up, was particularly useful to the war effort with soil analysis impacting aircraft and tank designs. Glanville had a particular interest in explosives and he helped Edward Terrell of the Admiralty's DMWD develop a stone-chip-and-bitumen protective plating "plastic armour" which was installed on the bridges and gun positions of most allied merchant vessels. The RRL was asked to test samples of plastic armour against machine-gun bullets by the Department of the Inspector of Anti-Aircraft Weapons and Devices in August 1940. The material supplied proved unsatisfactory but Glanville recommended that the fine grit used in the samples be replaced by larger stone particles. Revised samples, with an additional backing of thin steel plate, performed well under test. A programme of works in the field was then approved at a 25 August conference. RRL testing showed that armour containing the strongest stones performed best and that it worked well in a wide range of temperatures making the armour suitable for deployment in the North Atlantic winter or the Red Sea. It was also proved that the armour provided protection against incendiary devices. Glanville was named on the patent for the material, alongside Terrell in September 1940. Work to armour ships began just one month after the RRL began its investigations, beginning with the SS Empire Frost, which was then under construction in Glasgow. Later research produced armour suited to protection against cannon shells and shrapnel. Plastic armour, and the related "Plastic Protection Plating", was installed on naval vessels, army landing craft, mobile anti-aircraft batteries and coastal defence emplacements. Post-war Terrell shared a £9,500 government award for the invention with Glanville.

He also led investigations into the effects of explosions on earth and concrete structures, becoming a pioneer in the wider use of scale models in this field. In the early war years much of this work was focussed on the effect of German bombs on buildings so that civil defence could be better planned. Work in this field included the testing of anti-shatter treatments for windows, assessing the performance of walls and trenches of different constructions and studying the passage of blast pressures which can cause death without structural damage. Glanville's department also developed smoke screens to protect high-priority targets (such as factories) from bombardment and studied how vibrations, for example from digging equipment used by bomb disposal teams, could trigger German anti-handling devices.

Glanville's most famous contribution to the war effort was his work, with Barnes Wallis, on the bouncing bombs used in the famous Dambusters raids. Glanville was responsible for calculating the correct explosives charge and for the use of scale models to test the theory on. Post-war analysis of the raids has shown that Glanville's breach size forecasts were accurate to within 10%. His experiments with scale models of the dams provided the targeting point for the raids on the Möhne and Eder dams.

He also worked on bituminous surfacing materials and settlement in embankment which he continued after the war, leading to Road Note 29, the structural design standard for roads. In 1943 the road safety research question resurfaced and Glanville held discussions with DSIR on the role that the RRL could play in post-war road safety research. The following year the parliamentary secretary to the Ministry of War Transport, Philip Noel-Baker, visited the RRL and reached the opinion that road safety research should be the responsibility of the RRL. Glanville sought to make the Road Research Board more independent of the MOT and successfully proposed Sir Clement Hindley as chair in 1943, though he died in May 1944. Also in 1943 he proposed that the RRL meet monthly with representatives from the Ministry of War Transport, though such meetings were not implemented until 1945 and equivalents with the MOT on traffic and road safety were not implemented until 1953; this was partly because Glanville's deputy Reuben Smeed did not see their value. In general the meetings on materials and construction methods were more successful than those on road safety and road planning policy.

In November 1944 Glanville had discussions with representatives from DSIR the Ministry of War Transport and the Ministry of Transport to determine how research should be carried out in the post war years. The discussions concluded that the RRL should be permitted to carry out experiments on roads in use by the public and to re-establish the Road Research Board (RRB) to raise awareness of the RRL's research. That the discussions were successful, despite previous strained relationships, was partly due to Glanville's good relationship with the MOWT's representative H. R. Lintern, whom he had known from early in his career.

== Post-war ==
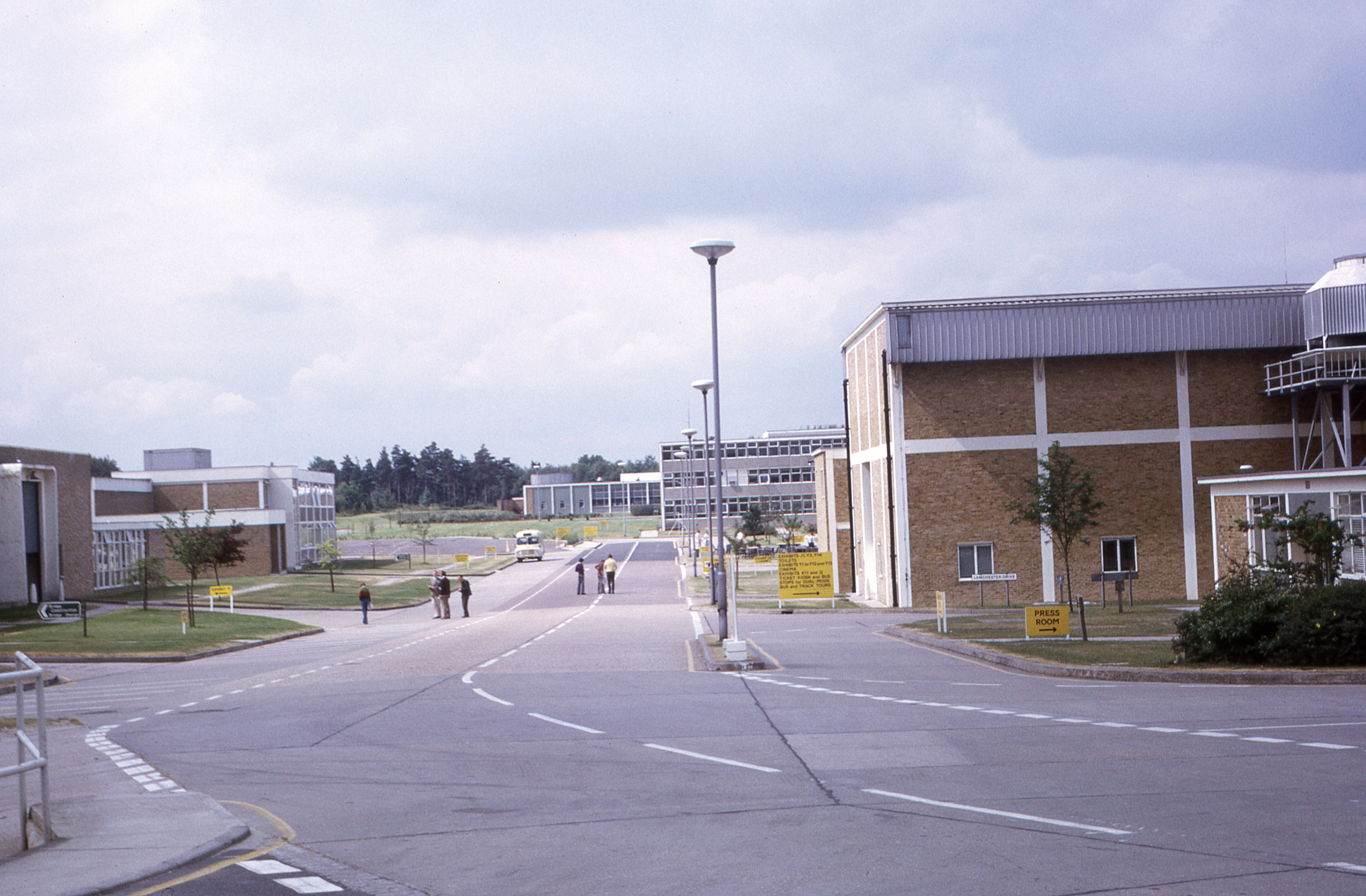
The RRL's facility at Crowthorne, photographed in 1975

After the war Glanville remained with the RRL and concentrated on research into road safety. The organisation soon adopted a radical new form of study, implementing experiments on live highways. This method resulted in improvements to surfacing materials, road marking paint, and non-skid treatments. The laboratory was significantly enlarged in 1946 and took on a wider remit to investigate road safety and traffic management. Research in this area lead to better tyre materials, zebra crossings, speed limits, and laws regarding the wearing of safety helmets and seat belts. The RRL also investigated headlight dazzle, braking distances and the effects off alcohol on drivers. Glanville required the wider use of zebra crossings in road layouts, which led to an 11% fall in pedestrian fatalities by 1951–2. Glanville correctly predicted a post-war rise in the use of motor transport, though it was an even greater increase than he predicted.

There remained conflict between the MOT and DSIR over control of the RRL. Glanville sought to smooth relations with the MOT in the post-war years and instructed his staff that any requests for advice from the MOT should be given top priority. At the same time he made it clear to the MOT that the research direction of the RRL was his responsibility

As well as road safety work he also worked in the field of concrete engineering. In 1956 he was a visiting lecturer at Cape Town University. In 1957 he chaired the International Road Safety Research Conference. The RRL under Glanville also investigated the layout of road networks and town planning and the properties of road construction materials and became renowned as the leading road organisation in the world. Under his leadership work began on new premises for the RRL in Crowthorne. In 1966 one of the buildings at the new site was named Glanville Hall in his honour. Glanville's period at the RRL included the development of the country's first motorways and Glanville and his department played key roles in developing those roads and resolving early issues.

Glanville declined numerous opportunities to leave the RRL to take up university professorships and senior positions in industry or with the Ministry of Transport; these all offered higher salaries. Charlesworth considers that the only post he may have accepted, but which was not offered, was that of secretary of DSIR. Charlesworth thought that if he had received the post in the mind 1950s he may have been able to prevent the break-up of DSIR in 1965. In 1955 GLanville had overseen the extension of the RRL's remit to roads abroad and, in 1962, to bridges.

Glanville summed up his approach to research, saying that it must "be weighed in the balance of practical experience and application; that the problems of the research engineer are revealed by the difficulties of practice; and that to make his full contribution the researcher must follow these problems into the realm of practice". He sought to involve practicing professional in his research, seeking to tailor his research to the needs of the construction industry. Glanville was a firm believer in the relative independence of DSIR and its research stations from ministerial control. Glanville promoted the use of research boards within DSIR through which the activities of each research station could be directed. Although this required additional work to prepare reports and answer queries the presence of industry leaders, academic and government representatives on the Road Research Board increased awareness of the work of the RRL and allowed it to be directed more to the needs of these stakeholders.

In 1962 the government appointed Sir Burke Trend to lead a committee of enquiry into the organisation of the civil service. Trend's report in October 1963 recommended that DSIR be dissolved and replaced by an independent Industrial Research and Development Authority (IRDA) and that consideration be given to transferring some of the research stations to ministerial departments (the RRL to the Ministry of Transport and the BRS to the Ministry of Public Building and Works). Glanville was critical of the Trend Report for a perceived lack of hard evidence for its conclusions. He stated "its views are simply a series of assertions and, in view of the subject it was considering, such an unscientific approach is outstanding". Glanville considered that the problem with the RRL was that ministers did not direct the laboratory to carry out research in the appropriate areas prior to making policy decisions, he considered a solution would be to have an RRL representative involved in consultations at the policy-making stage. Glanville considered that the move to IRDA would further remove the RRL from policy-making and exacerbate the current problems. He was also concerned that separating the RRL further from government would reduce its standing with the local authorities and police forces and prevent the sharing of confidential information from these parties. He was critical of the proposal to bring the RRL under the MoT as it would involve a second layer of scientific staff working for the MoT who would need to interpret the output of the RRL for ministers, Glanville preferred that the RRL be directly consulted. He was also concerned that the RRL may not be able to preserve its objectivity and might be swayed by political pressure; separation of research from politicians, the so-called Haldane principle, had long been customary in Britain. Glanville was unable to present evidence to the Trend committee and there was an apparent political desire to abolish DSIR. In 1964 the Conservative Douglas-Home ministry stated that it would follow Trend's recommendations. When the Labour Wilson ministry came to power in October 1964 DSIR was dissolved and the RRL transferred to the MoT. The minister responsible, Tom Fraser made guarantees to Glanville that the RRL would "continue to function as a separate entity with proper safeguards for its scientific independence".

The RRL was transferred between various government ministries and departments as a result of mergers until, under the Department for Transport, it was privatised in 1996 as TRL Ltd. The BRS followed a similar path until its privatisation, by management buy-out, as BRE Ltd in March 1997.

== Professional institutions ==
Glanville was involved with many professional institutions and other bodies. He had many contacts abroad through his road research and chaired the Institution of Civil Engineers (ICE) committee which organised the biennial overseas conference. Glanville was elected President of the ICE in November 1950 and such was his popularity in that office that there was a movement amongst members to waive the law that limits presidents to one term that had long been in the statute books. He was a member of the organising committee of several road related bodies as well as the International Society for Soil Mechanics in 1957 and the ICE conference on civil engineering problems overseas from 1952 to 1970. He served on the British Standards codes of practice committee from 1940 to 1965, on the Royal Engineers' advisory board from 1950 to 1965, and on the board of the British Nuclear Energy Conference from 1953 to 1958. He was also a member of the Civil Engineering Research Council and its later incarnations, and in 1969 was president of the Smeatonian Society of Civil Engineers.

== Retirement ==
In 1965, at the age of 65, Glanville retired from the directorship of the RRL and established a private civil and structural engineering consultancy. In March 1965 he had set out his plans for the future of the RRL after his retirement. He noted that the field of road research had changed from 1955 when the RRL was the only body, to one in which the MOT, universities, the Medical Research Council, the Motor Industries Research Association, the Policem the Overseas Development Ministry, the Ministry of Housing and Local Government, and industry bodies were all carrying out research. He stressed the need for this research to be directed by a single body in a way that the RRB was not. He proposed a Highway Research Council be established to fill this role, in a similar manner to the Highway Research Board in the US, and the RRB dissolved.

Glanville was asked by the president of the International Road Federation to serve as their consultant, a service he provided for ten years, and organised the papers presented at their world meetings in London and Washington. He was the federation's European representative to their survey of research into roads carried out across 72 counties. Glanville acted as an expert witness for the Ministry of Transport and the Department of the Environment in court cases and also worked as an arbitrator. William Glanville died suddenly of a stroke, on 30 June 1976, at his home in Northwood, Middlesex. Only two days prior to his death he had attended a CIRIA meeting.

== Honours ==
Glanville obtained the degrees of PhD in 1925 and DSc in 1930 in the course of his work at the BRS. He was recognised by the government for his important work and was made a Commander of the Order of the British Empire (CBE) in the 1944 New Year Honours, a Companion of the Order of the Bath (CB) in the 1953 New Year Honours, and was knighted in the 1960 New Year Honours. He was awarded the Institution of Structural Engineers Gold Medal in 1962 and was a fellow of that institution. He received the Viva Shield and gold medal of the Worshipful Company of Carmen in 1965. He was an honorary member of the Institutions of Municipal Engineers, Highway Engineers and Royal Engineers, and of the Concrete Society. He was a fellow and governor of Queen Mary College, London, and almoner, governor of Christ's Hospital, Horsham and was elected a fellow of the Royal Society in 1958. In all he published 115 articles, papers and books. He received the Ewing Gold Medal of the ICE for his research work.

In 1966 he was appointed an honorary member of the American Concrete Institute.

On 11 June 1976 he became a founding fellow of the Fellowship of Engineering.

== Personal life ==
Glanville married Millient Carr on 20 June 1930 by whom he had a daughter and a son. The latter would follow in his father's footsteps and become a civil engineer, his daughter worked for a London publishing house. Millicent accompanied Glanville to meetings and conferences and the couple travelled widely. He lived in Northwood, Middlesex by 1957. In his six years of retirement Glanville helped his son's engineering consultancy practices (Glanville & Associates and STATS) by acting as a consultant.

Glanville was chairman of Coulsdon and Purley Urban District Council for 1954–55.

A memorial service was held for Glanville at St Margaret's Church, Westminster on 2 November 1976. Sit William Harris, a former director at the Ministry of Transport, said "Although he spent the whole of his career in scientific research, Bill Glanville - as he was known to many of us - was one of the great engineers of his era and it was as a research engineer, rather than a scientist, that he saw himself".

== In popular culture ==
Glanville was played by Colin Tapley in The Dam Busters (1955), the film depiction of Operation Chastise, he was credited as "Dr W. H. Glanville". However the portrayal is somewhat misleading in that it depicts Glanville and the RRL as subordinate to Barnes Wallis whilst this was not the case and both parties worked on an equal footing.

Glanville is featured on a plaque on Imperial College London's Skempton Building, which houses its Department of Civil and Environmental Engineering.

== Bibliography ==
- Charlesworth, George (1990). Sir William Glanville. Henley-on-Thames, England: Gresham Books. ISBN 0-946095-26-4.

Professional and academic associations
Preceded by Vernon Robertson	President of the Institution of Civil Engineers; November 1950 – November 1951	Succeeded by Allan Quartermaine
