= Netherlands East Indies Forces Intelligence Service =

Dutch intelligence and special operations organisation in WWII-era Netherlands East Indies

- Netherlands Forces Intelligence Service

Intelligence and special operations (wartime) overview
- Formed: 1942
- Dissolved: 1948
- Type: Military intelligence (wartime)
- Jurisdiction: Netherlands East Indies (government-in-exile; later NEI/Indonesia)
- Headquarters: Melbourne, Australia (wartime); later Batavia (Jakarta)

Netherlands East Indies Forces Intelligence Service (NEFIS) was a Dutch intelligence and special operations organisation established in Australia after the Japanese conquest of the Netherlands East Indies (NEI) in 1942 and later active in the NEI/Indonesia during the post-war transition. It was intended to provide Allied commanders with intelligence on political, military and economic conditions in Japanese-occupied territory and, through clandestine field work, to support reconnaissance and reporting from occupied areas.

NEFIS is often associated in Allied summaries with hazardous insertions of small reconnaissance parties into occupied territory (frequently linked to “NEFIS III” in post-war accounts), including the Java “Tiger” missions and other operations in the archipelago and New Guinea.

== Background ==
Dutch intelligence and counter-espionage structures existed in the Netherlands East Indies before 1942, shaped in part by concerns about Japanese espionage and regional instability. The rapid Japanese conquest of the NEI in early 1942 disrupted pre-war administrative and security structures, prompting a reconstitution of Dutch civil and military functions in exile, including intelligence coordination.

== History ==
=== Formation in Australia ===
NEFIS was established in Melbourne soon after the fall of the NEI to provide Allied headquarters with current intelligence about developments inside the occupied territories. Accounts of the organisation’s origins describe early Dutch intelligence work in Australia as initially improvised and later formalised under the English-language name “NEFIS” to facilitate coordination with Allied staffs.

=== Relationship with Allied intelligence structures ===
NEFIS operated within the broader Allied intelligence architecture in Australia, including coordination in the Allied Intelligence Bureau (AIB) environment that combined intelligence, special operations and propaganda functions across multiple Allied partners. In this context, NEFIS contributed to intelligence collection and supported field insertions intended to gather information for later Allied planning in the NEI.

=== Post-war role and transition ===
Archival guides describe NEFIS’s post-1945 shift back to the NEI/Indonesia and an expanded intelligence and security role during the transitional period, with reporting on political and security developments. A Leiden University thesis examining NEFIS archival holdings for 1945–1949 identifies recurring subject areas including political conditions, propaganda, underground activity and information about armed forces. Archival descriptions indicate that in 1948 NEFIS was reorganised/absorbed into the Centrale Militaire Inlichtingendienst (CMI), with postwar intelligence records continuing into the 1945–1949 period covered by NEFIS/CMI archival inventories.

== Organisation and functions ==
The Australian War Memorial describes NEFIS as a multi-branch organisation encompassing diverse intelligence functions and distribution activities, later divided into multiple subsections including collection, counterintelligence, military intelligence, civil affairs intelligence, photographic reproduction and oil intelligence. Dutch archival inventories likewise describe holdings that include reporting, interrogations, liaison reporting, topographic information and other intelligence products, reflecting both wartime and post-war concerns.

=== Field operations (often associated with “NEFIS III”) ===
Secondary summaries identify NEFIS III as the element best remembered for inserting reconnaissance patrols and agents into occupied territory—missions described as dangerous and often unsuccessful, with significant loss of life. The National Archives of Australia’s compiled “Special Operations – Australia” history records NEFIS-linked operations within the wider record of wartime special operations based in Australia.

== Operations ==
The map shows NEFIS bases in Australia and selected operational/activity areas in the Netherlands East Indies and Dutch New Guinea, including post‑war activity in Batavia (Jakarta).

Legend: Blue = NEFIS bases in Australia; Red = representative operational/activity areas.

NEFIS is best remembered for clandestine insertions of reconnaissance parties into Japanese-occupied territory. The Australian War Memorial notes that these missions were often extremely hazardous, and that the “Tiger” missions on Java were captured and executed “almost to a man”; it also identifies “Walnut” and “Whiting” as similarly disastrous, while describing “Oaktree” as an exceptional long-running success.

=== Operation Tiger (Java) ===
The “Tiger” missions involved clandestine landings of small parties on the south coast of Java in 1942–1943. Allied summaries emphasise that Tiger I–VI suffered catastrophic losses through capture and execution, limiting the establishment of durable clandestine networks on the island during occupation.

=== Operation Walnut (Aroe Islands) ===
The Australian War Memorial identifies “Walnut” (Aroe Islands) among NEFIS-linked insertion efforts that suffered severe losses. Compiled special-operations histories also list NEFIS-linked operations in the region, including Walnut, within the broader record of wartime operations based in Australia.

=== Operation Whiting (Dutch New Guinea) ===
Australian War Memorial photographic documentation records that a special operations group at Lumi (New Guinea) later split into two parties codenamed “Whiting” and “Locust”, with Whiting heading for the Hollandia area. Australian War Memorial biographical and photographic records link the Whiting party’s reconnaissance work to the capture and execution of Sergeant Leonard Siffleet and Ambonese companions in October 1943.

=== Operation Oaktree (Dutch New Guinea) ===
In contrast to many failed insertions, the Australian War Memorial describes “Oaktree” as a long-running party in Dutch New Guinea that supplied intelligence, tied down Japanese forces and maintained Dutch prestige among local communities between 1942 and 1944.

== Propaganda role and FELO ==
The Australian War Memorial notes that a NEFIS function dealing with propaganda expanded and was separated from NEFIS as the Far Eastern Liaison Office (FELO). Accounts of FELO describe it as a propaganda and misdirection organisation responsible for preparing and disseminating psychological warfare material (including leaflet propaganda) in the South West Pacific Area, alongside but distinct from sabotage-oriented special operations.

== Impact on Java ==
NEFIS’s most direct wartime impact on Java is associated with clandestine insertions such as the Tiger series. Allied summaries describe the Tiger missions as catastrophic, with widespread capture and execution, constraining NEFIS’s ability to sustain intelligence networks on Java during occupation. A Dutch Defence Academy thesis on wartime Dutch intelligence operations launched from Australia argues that such operations faced systemic disadvantages—including limited preparation, limited equipment and the inherent difficulty of operating in occupied territory—contributing to failure.

== Operations summary table ==
Selected NEFIS-linked wartime operations and outcomes (overview)
Operation	Area	Purpose (summary)	Outcome (summary)	Key sources
Tiger (Java)	Java (south coast)	Reconnaissance and attempted clandestine reporting from occupied Java	Multiple parties captured; heavy losses; widely described as catastrophic	
Walnut	Aroe Islands (Aru)	Reconnaissance/field insertion attempts in occupied territory	Heavy losses reported in Allied summary	
Whiting	Dutch New Guinea (Hollandia/Aitape area)	Coastwatching/reconnaissance insertion (in parallel with “Locust”)	Party associated with capture and execution documented by AWM	
Oaktree	Dutch New Guinea (interior)	Long-term intelligence gathering (as described in Allied summary)	Described as an exception: extended duration and useful intelligence effect	

== Archives and legacy ==
Surviving NEFIS records are dispersed across repositories. The Nationaal Archief inventory for wartime and postwar Dutch military intelligence in the NEI (including NEFIS and the CMI) describes material on “parties” sent into occupied territory, liaison reporting, interrogations, topographic information and post-war security/intelligence organisation. Leiden University Libraries (KITLV collections) also describe a NEFIS archive consisting of memorandums on political groupings and communism, and summarise NEFIS’s growth in Australia, relocation to Batavia after 1945 and merger into successor structures.

== See also ==
- Z Experimental Station
- Combined Services Detailed Interrogation Centre, Brisbane
- Politieke Inlichtingendienst
- Korps Insulinde
