= Benabena, Papua New Guinea =

Benabena, also known as Bena Bena, is a stretch of valley that extends to the east of Goroka town in the west and borders with the Upper Ramu area of Madang Province to the north, Ungaii District to its south and Henganofi District to its east. The name "Bena Bena" derived from a small hamlet or village just a few kilometres away from the once small rural station of Sigerehi in the Upper Bena area in the Eastern Highlands of Papua New Guinea. The Bena Bena Valley was once known for a centre for weaving.

== History ==
An airfield was constructed near the village by Dan Leahy and Jim Taylor in December 1932. A Lutheran mission station commenced operations at the village in 1934.
