= Allied Intelligence Bureau =

WWII Allied intelligence agency

The Allied Intelligence Bureau (AIB) was a joint United States, Australian, Dutch and British intelligence and special operations agency during World War II. It was responsible for operating parties of spies and commandos behind Japanese lines in order to collect intelligence and conduct guerrilla warfare against Japanese forces in the South West Pacific. The AIB was formed in June 1942 to coordinate the existing Allied propaganda and guerrilla organisations. The first controller of the AIB was Colonel C. G. Roberts. At its peak the AIB contained men from ten individual services and controlled or coordinated eight separate organisations. The role of the AIB was to obtain information about the enemy, "to weaken the enemy by sabotage and destruction of morale and to lend aid and assistance to local effort to the same end in enemy territories." One member of the AIB was Alfred Deakin Brookes, who went on to become the first head of the Australian Secret Intelligence Service in May 1952.

== Structure ==
The AIB was divided into four sections; A, B, C and D. Each section focused on a specific area of operations:

A Section
A Section consisted of Special Operations Australia, which was later known as the Services Reconnaissance Department, and focused on information collection and commando operations. A Section was initially commanded by Major G. Egerton Mott.

B Section
B Section focused on secret intelligence and was commanded by Captain R. Kendall, RN, known as Secret Intelligence Australia (SIA)

C Section
C Section gathered field intelligence through Coastwatchers, natives and civilians. C Section was commanded by Commander Eric Feldt, RANVR.

D Section
D Section was the Far Eastern Liaison Office which was concerned with propaganda and was commanded by Commander J. C. Proud, RANVR.

The AIB was disbanded at the end of the war.

== Attached vessels ==
- HMAS Paluma (1942–1944)

== See also ==
- G-2 (intelligence)
- Netherlands East Indies Forces Intelligence Service
- Office of Strategic Services
- Special Operations Executive
- Z Special Unit
