= Services Reconnaissance Department =

WW2 Australian military intelligence & special reconnaissance unit

Services Reconnaissance Department (SRD), also known as Special Operations Australia (SOA) and previously known as Inter-Allied Services Department (ISD), was an Australian military intelligence and special reconnaissance unit, during World War II.

== Foundation ==
Authorised by Prime Minister John Curtin in March 1942, following the outbreak of war with Japan, the Inter-Allied Services Department was formed on 17 April 1942, having been given approval by General Thomas Blamey. Modelled initially on the British Special Operations Executive (SOE), it was organised initially by SOE British Army officer, Lieutenant Colonel G. Egerton Mott. For security reasons it was named ISD and its existence was to be only known by the Prime Minister and the High Command.

== Operations ==
On 6 July 1942, the Allied Intelligence Bureau (AIB) was formed to co-ordinate the operations of ISD and other similar organisations; AIB became fully functional in December 1942. ISD was officially known within AIB as "Section A". In June 1942, an ISD raiding/commando unit was organised, named Z Special Unit.

Between February and April 1943, ISD was officially disbanded and replaced by a new body, Special Operations Australia (SOA). The cover name Services Reconnaissance Department (SRD) was given to SOA. in May 1943. It was decided that a covert reconnaissance and field intelligence unit, M Special Unit, would be formed under the auspices of SOA to complement the raiding activities of Z Special Unit.

SOA oversaw intelligence-gathering, reconnaissance and raiding missions in Japanese-occupied areas of New Guinea, the Dutch East Indies (Indonesia), Portuguese Timor (East Timor), the Malayan Peninsula, British Borneo and Singapore.

== See also ==
- Allied Intelligence Bureau
- Coastwatchers
- HMAS Nyanie
- M Special Unit
- Netherlands East Indies Forces Intelligence Service
- Pacific War
- Secret Intelligence Australia
- Z Special Unit
