= The Arena (TV series) =

2007 Singaporean TV series

- Presented by: Jason Chan, Adrian Pang
- Country of origin: Singapore
- No. of seasons: 2
- No. of episodes: 34

Production
- Executive producers: Ignatius Teo; Julie Sim-Chew
- Producers: Tan Ing How; Prem Anand; Lindsay Jialin; Monica Goh; Vivian Chew
- Running time: 60 Minutes

Original release
- Network: Mediacorp Channel 5
- Release: 9 January 2007 – 26 May 2008

The Arena was a debate-style television show produced by Mediacorp Channel 5 in Singapore. Two seasons of the show were broadcast, with Season one held on January–March 2007, and season two on March–May 2008. The show involves teams of students from secondary schools in Singapore debating against each other on issues of topical interest. The show is hosted by Adrian Pang in the first season, before replaced with Jason Chan in Season two.

The Arena was one of the four nominees for the 2007 International Emmy Award in the 'Children and Young People' category, alongside shows from Australia, Brazil and Poland. (The winning show in the category was The Magic Tree from Poland.) The Arena was also one of six nominees for the 'Best Game or Quiz Programme' at the 2008 Asian Television Awards. The series has spawned with two international versions, in Thailand and Vietnam.

== Rules ==
In each episode, two schools, each with three speakers per school, engaged on a debate, a process that involves formal discourse, discussion, and oral addresses on a particular topic or collection of topic, which varies each episode. Each match consist of three rounds and one rebuttal round in-between the second and third round. Only one speaker may participate in one round at a time, while all three speakers must participate in a rebuttal round. In season one, the time limit was 3.5-4-4.5 minutes, while in season two, the structure is standardized to four minutes each.

Participating speakers stood on the central podium, and spoke directly to one opponent from the other team (rather than facing to the audience and the judges as in most other debate formats). Each speaker took turns to address their speeches and can end early if desired. The opposing speaker, at any time during their speech, may interrupt their debate to prove their points of information at a press of a button, during which the current speaker for the round is not allowed to interrupt or oppose theirs until their challenge ended. Each team is allowed a 1.5 minute rebuttal time (indicated in as "rebuttal bank"), which is accumulated in succeeding rounds; whenever the rebuttal is in effect, their current time limit is frozen.

The rebuttal round (called Quickfire round in Season two) involves all speakers participating in a roundtable discussion. Unlike the three rounds, the rebuttal time is not used and the 1.5 minute time limit run concurrently, similar to a Chess clock; one at a time, each speaker took turns to debate, and they must press the button on the central podium to end their turn before passing their turn to their opponent. Each speaker may take only one turn during the round.

After each round, the panel of judges will evaluate each speaker's debate. In season one, scoring is determined by votes cast from the judges, with each vote awarding points (5-6-7-7; for a maximum score of 100). The votes for the first two rounds are immediately announced after each round, while the last two rounds are later announced on the results show (the decision from each judge is not shown).

In season two, the scoring system was revamped and while each round carries a maximum score of 20 (and revealed immediately), an additional 20 points for "Team Strategy" is awarded for their performance and teamwork. Results are determined by best-of-three scores from each of the judges, which counts as a vote; the school who obtained a higher individual score from at least two judges wins the match.

Winning schools advance to the next round while the best performing losing schools (based on the losing scores) after all the matches for the current phase will advance as wildcard. In total, there are six schools in the quarterfinals, then reduced to four in the semifinals, and then two in the finale. In season two, as there are 12 schools and with a change of match deciding format, there are no wildcards in the first round (though there is a wildcard in the quarterfinal, awarded to the school who have won at least one judge's vote).

== Results ==
The school won the final match and become champions.
The school lost the final match and become runners-up.
The school won the match.
The school lost the match, but advanced by wildcard.
The school lost the match and was eliminated.

=== Season 1 (2007) ===
In season one, ten schools competed for the title. Each episode consists of two shows, one debate round and one results show. The resident judges for the season are National University of Singapore Senior Lecturer K.K. Seet, Nominated Member of Parliament and former Miss Singapore Universe Eunice Olsen and Today journalist and Debate Association Singapore Executive Committee Ashraf Safdar.

Episode	Topic	Guest judge	Schools	Results				
Episode	Topic	Guest judge	Schools	R1	R2	RB	R3	Total
First round
1 (9 January)	Hey Good Looking, You're a Winner! Good looks triumph over effort.	Woffles Wu	Loyang Secondary School	10	6	14	21	51
1 (9 January)	Hey Good Looking, You're a Winner! Good looks triumph over effort.	Woffles Wu	Raffles Institution	10	18	14	7	49
2 (16 January)	Selfish? Yes We Are! Today's youth are motivated by self-centeredness alone.	Cheryl Fox	CHIJ St. Nicholas Girls' School	0	0	14	14	28
2 (16 January)	Selfish? Yes We Are! Today's youth are motivated by self-centeredness alone.	Cheryl Fox	Methodist Girls' School	20	24	14	14	72
3 (30 January)	Don't Try to be Funny! Our society does not encourage a sense of humour.	Tan Kheng Hua	Kuo Chuan Presbyterian Secondary School	15	0	28	0	43
3 (30 January)	Don't Try to be Funny! Our society does not encourage a sense of humour.	Tan Kheng Hua	Xinmin Secondary School	5	24	0	28	57
4 (6 February)	Singapore, a Self-Service Nation! Local service standards have a long way to go.	Jennie Chua	United World College of South East Asia	0	18	24	24	74
4 (6 February)	Singapore, a Self-Service Nation! Local service standards have a long way to go.	Jennie Chua	Nanyang Girls' High School	20	6	0	0	26
5 (13 February)	Teach First Sex Later! Protecting our youth from sex now causes social problems later.	Samuel Ng	Hwa Chong Institution	5	24	28	21	78
5 (13 February)	Teach First Sex Later! Protecting our youth from sex now causes social problems later.	Samuel Ng	CHIJ Katong Convent	15	0	0	7	22
Quarterfinals
6 (20 February)	To Hide or Not to Hide? Internet anonymity is bad for us all.	Adrian Tan	Xinmin Secondary School	5	12	14	14	45
6 (20 February)	To Hide or Not to Hide? Internet anonymity is bad for us all.	Adrian Tan	Loyang Secondary School	15	12	14	14	55
7 (27 February)	Where Do We Stand? Singapore's youth are politically apathetic.	Viswa Sadasivan	Raffles Institution	0	12	21	21	54
7 (27 February)	Where Do We Stand? Singapore's youth are politically apathetic.	Viswa Sadasivan	Hwa Chong Institution	20	12	7	7	46
8 (6 March)	Mother Knows Best; Mothers should stay at home to raise children.	Daisy Irani	Methodist Girls' School	0	6	7	7	20
8 (6 March)	Mother Knows Best; Mothers should stay at home to raise children.	Daisy Irani	United World College of South East Asia	20	18	21	21	80
Semifinals
9 (13 March)	The Pressing Issue; Bloggers are becoming more influential than journalists.	Tan Chi Chiu	Loyang Secondary School	5	6	0	0	11
9 (13 March)	The Pressing Issue; Bloggers are becoming more influential than journalists.	Tan Chi Chiu	Hwa Chong Institution	15	18	28	28	89
10 (20 March)	First Among Equals; Singapore's education system breeds elitism.	Gaurav Keerthi	Raffles Institution	0	6	0	0	6
10 (20 March)	First Among Equals; Singapore's education system breeds elitism.	Gaurav Keerthi	United World College of South East Asia	20	18	28	28	94
Final
11 (27 March)	Modern Softies; Youth today are less prepared for future challenges than their parents' generation.	Viswa Sadasivan	Hwa Chong Institution	15	0	0	7	22
11 (27 March)	Modern Softies; Youth today are less prepared for future challenges than their parents' generation.	Viswa Sadasivan	United World College of South East Asia	5	24	28	21	78

=== Season 2 (2008) ===
The defending champions, United World College of South East Asia, was initially selected but did not take part this season as their student examination clashed with their planned recording dates. K.K. Seet reprised his role as a resident judge, and was joined by President of Debate Association Singapore Gaurav Keerthi, who previously appeared as a guest judge for the second semifinals last season. Ashraf and Olsen did not return to the judging panel, though the former appeared as a judge in the unaired preliminary selection rounds (alongside former sporting coach and former President of Debate Association Singapore Geetha Creffield, and Secretary of the World Schools Debating Council and Tournament Director of the Singapore Secondary Schools Debating Championships Mark Gabriel.

The best score per each judge is highlighted. Each episode also award one speaker the Best Speaker of the day. An award was given for the Best Speaker of the Series at the end of the season, which went to Nicholas Quah of Raffles Institution.

Episode	Topic	Judge	Schools	Scores (in order of rounds)		
Episode	Topic	Judge	Schools	Seet	Guest	Gaurav
First round
1 (10 March)	Going for gold, but on our steam only Only native-born citizens should be allowed to represent Singapore in international sports	Leonard Thomas	Raffles Institution	15+14+15+15+15=74	15+13+14+13+13=68	15+14+15+15+14=72
1 (10 March)	Going for gold, but on our steam only Only native-born citizens should be allowed to represent Singapore in international sports	Leonard Thomas	CHIJ St. Nicholas Girls' School	14+15+15+14+14=72	14+14+14+15+14=71	14+12+14+14+14=67
2 (17 March)	Saving the environment, just a load of hot air! Singapore should be playing a bigger part in the battle against global warming	Ivy Singh-Lim	Global Indian International School	13+13+13+14+13=66	16+14+12+16+14=72	14+13+12+14+14=67
2 (17 March)	Saving the environment, just a load of hot air! Singapore should be playing a bigger part in the battle against global warming	Ivy Singh-Lim	Jurong Secondary School	13+14+14+15+15=71	14+14+12+15+12=67	14+14+12+13+15=68
3 (24 March)	A First World city, but without social graciousness Singaporeans lack the civic-mindedness of other modern societies	Jennie Chua	Hwa Chong Institution	15+15+15+15+14=74	15+13+14+15+15=72	14+12+13+15+13=67
3 (24 March)	A First World city, but without social graciousness Singaporeans lack the civic-mindedness of other modern societies	Jennie Chua	CHIJ St Joseph's Convent	12+14+13+15+12=66	12+12+13+12+13=62	13+14+12+11+13=63
4 (31 March)	Intelligent clones, but not ready for the world Singapore's education system does not prepare students for the challenges of the working world	Mark Gabriel	Dunman Secondary School	12+12+11+14+13=62	13+16+12+13+12=66	12+14+12+14+12=64
4 (31 March)	Intelligent clones, but not ready for the world Singapore's education system does not prepare students for the challenges of the working world	Mark Gabriel	St Joseph's Institution	11+11+11+14+11=58	11+15+13+15+11=65	11+12+12+14+11=60
5 (7 April)	New media, new dangers! The Internet has brought more harm than good to today's youth	Adrian Tan	Madrasah Al-Maarif Al-Islamiah	11+11+12+12+11=57	14+11+11+12+11=59	15+10+11+13+10=59
5 (7 April)	New media, new dangers! The Internet has brought more harm than good to today's youth	Adrian Tan	Singapore American School	12+12+13+12+12=61	11+14+12+11+12=60	11+12+11+12+14=60
6 (14 April)	Blame the parents for delinquent children! Parents should also be held responsible for crimes committed by their children	Mark Gabriel	Fairfield Methodist Secondary School	12+12+13+14+14=65	14+14+13+16+15=72	14+13+15+15+14=71
6 (14 April)	Blame the parents for delinquent children! Parents should also be held responsible for crimes committed by their children	Mark Gabriel	Nanyang Girls' High School	14+15+14+15+13=71	15+16+13+16+15=75	14+14+13+14+14=69
Quarterfinals
7 (21 April)	Just a little red dot with an identity crisis! Singapore suffers from the lack of a clear national identity	Adrian Tan	Hwa Chong Institution	12+14+13+14+14=67	15+13+15+15+13=71	14+14+14+15+14=71
7 (21 April)	Just a little red dot with an identity crisis! Singapore suffers from the lack of a clear national identity	Adrian Tan	Singapore American School	13+12+12+13+14=64	15+14+14+14+15=72	15+13+14+13+14=69
8 (28 April)	With great exposure comes great responsibility! The media should stop giving publicity to celebrities who have poor morals	Ovidia Yu	Raffles Institution	13+12+14+15+12=67	13+13+15+13+12=65	15+13+13+14+11=65
8 (28 April)	With great exposure comes great responsibility! The media should stop giving publicity to celebrities who have poor morals	Ovidia Yu	Dunman Secondary School	14+13+13+14+12=66	12+13+14+14+11=64	13+13+13+13+11=63
9 (5 May)	A shared security Singapore should introduce National Service for women	Cherian George	Jurong Secondary School	13+13+12+14+13=65	11+12+13+14+12=62	15+12+13+13+13=66
9 (5 May)	A shared security Singapore should introduce National Service for women	Cherian George	Nanyang Girls' High School	14+14+14+14+14=70	13+13+12+14+13=65	14+15+13+14+14=70
Semifinals
10 (12 May)	Break the glass ceiling! Organisations should be forced to place more women in senior positions	Peggy Pao	Raffles Institution	14+13+13+15+14=69	14+15+14+15+13=71	14+14+14+15+14=71
10 (12 May)	Break the glass ceiling! Organisations should be forced to place more women in senior positions	Peggy Pao	Hwa Chong Institution	14+12+12+14+13=65	15+15+15+15+13=73	14+15+14+14+13=70
11 (19 May)	The promise of science Science is progressing too fast for the good of society	Tan Chi Chiu	Nanyang Girls' High School	13+13+13+14+14=67	12+13+13+13+13=64	13+14+13+15+14=69
11 (19 May)	The promise of science Science is progressing too fast for the good of society	Tan Chi Chiu	Singapore American School	13+12+12+13+13=63	13+13+12+12+12=62	13+12+12+14+14=65
Final
12 (26 May)	Too much of a good thing! Freedom of speech has gone too far on the Web	Viswa Sadasivan	Nanyang Girls' High School	15+14+15+15+12=71	14+14+14+16+12=70	14+14+15+16+13=72
12 (26 May)	Too much of a good thing! Freedom of speech has gone too far on the Web	Viswa Sadasivan	Raffles Institution	14+15+14+16+13=72	15+16+14+17+13=75	15+15+15+15+14=74

== Reaction and criticism ==
The show was generally well received by the public and the press, though some criticisms were also raised by the Singapore media.

One area of the show that came in for criticism was the debate topics, some of which were thought to be too one-sided. Shortly after the show began airing, 8 Days magazine criticised the topic used for the preliminary round match-up between Methodist Girls' School and CHIJ St. Nicholas Girls' School ('Selfish? Yes We Are! – Today's youth are motivated by self-centeredness alone'), saying that it was significantly easier for the team arguing against the topic (MGS – who won by a 72-28 scoreline).

The scoring system, which required judges to allocate all their points for each round to one team, even if they felt that team was only slightly better, also came in for criticism. The scoreline of the second semi-final between the United World College of South East Asia and Raffles Institution, which ended in a 94-6 victory for UWC, was particularly highlighted as being an unfair reflection on the closeness of the match-up.

The show concluded around the same time as a series of letters from members of the public were published in the Forum section of The Straits Times, discussing the relative merits of Singapore's education system and that of international schools in Singapore. A number of these letters made reference to UWC's success in the competition, some of them arguing that this was an indication that the school was better at producing students with stronger thinking skills and presentation ability than local schools, and others disputing this.

=== Emmy Award nomination ===
The Arena was one of the four nominees for the 2007 International Emmy Award in the 'Children and Young People' category. The award was won by the Polish show The Magic Tree. The other two nominees in the category were Mortified (Australia) and Nutty Boy (Brazil).
