= Gaurav =

Male given name

Gaurav is an Indian and Nepalese male name. The name literally means 'honor', 'pride' or 'respect'.

== Notable people named Gaurav ==
- Gaurav S Bajaj (born 1990), Indian television actor
- Gaurav Bhatt, Indian Music Director, singer, songwriter.
- Gaurav Chakrabarty (born 1987), Indian (Bengali) actor
- Gaurav Chanana, Indian model, and film and television actor
- Gaurav Chaudhary (born 1991), Indian YouTuber
- Gaurav Chopra (born 1979), Indian actor
- Gaurav Dagaonkar (born 1982), Indian singer
- Gaurav Dhiman (born 1986), Indian cricketer
- Gaurav Gera (born 1973), Indian stand-up comedian and actor
- Gaurav Ghei (born 1968), Indian golfer
- Gaurav Gill (born 1981), Indian race car driver
- Gaurav Keerthi (born 1979), Singaporean television personality
- Gaurav Khanna (born 1981), Indian television actor
- Gaurav Kumar, (disambiguation)
- Gaurav More, Indian actor and comedian
- Gaurav Natekar (born 1972), Indian tennis player
- Gaurav Shumsher JB Rana (born 1955), Retired Chief of Army Staff of The Nepalese Army
- Gaurav Singh (Mizoram cricketer) (born 1999), Indian cricketer
- Gaurav Singh (Uttarakhand cricketer) (born 1996), Indian cricketer
- Gaurav Tiwari (1984–2016), Indian paranormal investigator

== See also ==
- Gourav
