= The Betel Nut Tree Mystery =

2024 book

- Author: Ovidia Yu
- Language: English
- Genre: Historical mystery
- Publisher: Constable
- Publication date: 7 May 2024
- Publication place: Singapore
- ISBN: 1472125231
- OCLC: 991673199
- Preceded by: The Frangipani Tree Mystery
- Followed by: The Paper Bark Tree Mystery

The Betel Nut Tree Mystery is a historical murder mystery novel written by Singaporean author Ovidia Yu. It is Yu's second novel featuring the character Chen Su Lin, the secretarial assistant to a Chief Inspector.

== Reception ==
Ann Northfield of the Historical Novels Review opined that the "writing and sense of time and place draw the reader into the story, and the characters are well drawn, interesting, and unusual, especially the main character." James Kidd of the South China Morning Post wrote that the "engaging human mystery works in graceful tandem with the grander international narratives about a fast-fracturing Asia and a fast-fracturing world." Olivia Ho of The Straits Times wrote that Yu "moves from strength to strength with the return of intrepid sleuth Chen Su-Lin, who continues to be an absolute delight."
