= Aunty Lee's Delights =

Detective fiction novel

Aunty Lee's Delights: A Singaporean Mystery
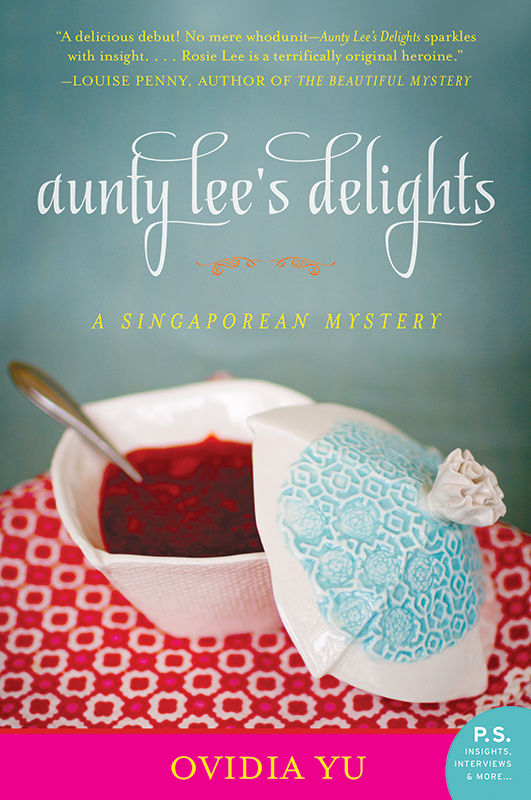
- Author: Ovidia Yu
- Cover artist: Laura Klynstra
- Language: English
- Series: Aunty Lee Series
- Genre: Cozy mystery; murder mystery
- Published: 17 September 2013
- Publisher: William Morrow and Company
- Publication place: Singapore
- Media type: Print (paperback, hardback)
- Pages: 288
- ISBN: 978-0-06-222715-7
- Followed by: Aunty Lee's Deadly Specials

Aunty Lee's Delights: A Singaporean Mystery is the first detective fiction novel in the Aunty Lee Series by Ovidia Yu. It was published in September 2013 by William Morrow and Company.

Set in Singapore, the story begins when a body washes up on Sentosa's tourist beach. The novel embodies the style of a cozy murder mystery and features Aunty Lee, the "Singaporean Miss Marple", as its primary detective. The novel highlights Peranakan culture and addresses LGBT issues. Aunty Lee's Delights received positive reviews from critics.

A Singaporean television series adaptation of the book series titled Aunty Lee's Deadly Delights premiered on Channel 5 in January 2026.

== Background ==
=== Author ===
The novel was written by Ovidia Yu, a Singaporean playwright and novelist. She has written several mystery books that have been published both locally and overseas. Yu has been described by theatre director K. K. Seet as "Singapore's first truly feminist writer and unabashed chronicler of all things female." The South China Morning Post characterized her work as both controversial and successful: "Her refusal to shy away from controversial issues has seen Yu, 56, become one of Singapore's most acclaimed, eclectic and internationally successful modern writers."

William Morrow and Company purchased the publishing rights to Aunty Lee's Delights in 2013.

=== Aunty Lee ===
The protagonist of Aunty Lee's Delights is Rosie Lee. Lee, or "Aunty" as she wants to be called, is an elderly Peranakan widow and amateur detective. Instead of retiring with her dead husband's wealth, she opens Aunty Lee's Delights, a cafe and catering business that serves Peranakan dishes on the resort island of Sentosa. Aunty Lee is described as open-minded, intelligent and insatiably curious. Her primary method of investigating is to question her guests over a specially cooked Peranakan dish or a tea brewed with medicinal herbs.

According to Yu, the character of Aunty Lee is based on an amalgam of an aunt and a good friend of her mother's. Both people, she says, are "lovely, lively, large ladies who are great cooks and love feeding people with food and advice."

== Plot summary ==
The body of a woman washes up on the beach of Sentosa and Aunty Lee begins to investigate. When a guest does not show to her wine tasting and dinner party, Aunty Lee immediately suspects the missing guest to be the murdered woman. The identity of the woman is soon confirmed as an employee of Aunty Lee's stepson. Later, another body washes up on the beach of Sentosa, prompting invigorated investigation from Police Commissioner Raja and Senior Staff Sergeant Salim. With the help of Auntie Lee's keen ability to uncover evidence, they eventually find the murderer.

=== Themes ===
The story focuses more on Aunty Lee's interactions with the other characters than the actual murder investigation. Peranakan dishes are heavily featured in the novel and the reader is introduced to the importance of food in local culture. The novel also addresses the complexities that surround LGBT acceptance in Singapore.

== Characters ==
- Rosie (Aunty Lee), an amateur sleuth
- Nina Balignasy, Aunty Lee's Filipino maid
- Mark Lee, Aunty Lee's stepson
- Selina Lee, Aunty Lee's stepdaughter-in-law
- Raja, the police commissioner
- SSS Salim Mawar, Senior Staff Sergeant of the Neighborhood Police Post
- Harry Sullivan, an Australian expatriate
- Frank and Lucy Cunningham, an elderly Australian tourist couple
- Laura Kwee, Mark and Selina's assistant
- Marianne Peters, a suicidal IT Consultant, sister to Mycroft Peters and daughter to Mr. and Mrs. Peters
- Carla Saito, an American visitor
- Cherril Lim-Peters, a former flight attendant who is married to Mycroft Peters
- Mycroft Peters, a high profile lawyer, brother to Marianne Peters and husband to Cherril Peters
- Professor Reginald Peters and Anne Peters, parents of Marianne and Mycroft Peters
- Joseph Cunningham and Otto, a gay couple

== Critical reception ==
Publishers Weekly found the book "engaging" and compared it to Alexander McCall Smith's The No. 1 Ladies' Detective Agency. Kirkus Reviews described Aunty Lee's Delights as "delightfully anachronistic" and complimented the "buoyant prose and a colorful cast, led by the lovably unstoppable sleuth herself." Reviewers for the Clitheroe Advertiser and Times and the San Francisco Book Review enjoyed the book's "exotic" setting which they felt gives foreign readers the opportunity to learn about Singaporean culture. The latter gave the book four out of five stars.

== Television adaptation ==
A Singaporean television series adaptation of the book series produced by Mediacorp titled Aunty Lee's Deadly Delights premiered on Channel 5 in January 2026, with Vernetta Lopez starring as the main character.
