= Gouravam =

Gouravam (lit. 'pride') can refer to these Indian films:

- Gauravam (1973 film), a Tamil film starring Sivaji Ganesan
- Gouravam (2013 film), a Tamil and Telugu bilingual film featuring Allu Sirish

== See also ==
- Gourav (disambiguation)
- Sanskaar – Dharohar Apnon Ki, an Indian Hindi soap opera, titled Gouravam in Tamil
- Gaurav, an Indian male given name
