= Details Cannot Body Wants =

1992 Singaporean play

- The 1993 cover of The Naturalisation of the Camelia and Details Cannot Body Wants
- Original language: English
- Written by: Chin Woon Ping
- Based on: Some of Chin's personal experiences
- Chorus: Unnamed 3-person chorus
- Characters: Unnamed speaker (Chin Woon Ping)
- Subject: Asian women's social identity in a mixed-influence society
- Genre: Dramatic monologue

Premiere
- Date: 12 September 1992
- Place: The Substation's Guinness Theatre, Singapore
- Directed by: K. K. Seet
- Original run: 12–13 September 1992

Details Cannot Body Wants is a Singaporean feminist play written by Chin Woon Ping and directed by K. K. Seet. It was first published in 1992 as The Naturalization of Camellia Song & Details Cannot Body Wants (which included the poetry anthology The Naturalization of Camellia Song) and staged on 12 and 13 September 1992 in The Substation's Guinness Theatre as part of the double bill Renewable Women, which contained Robert Yeo's Second Chance. It is a monologue by a nameless character (played by Chin) who rants against the societal, cultural, and emotional restrictions of Asian women in a mixed culture society and is supported by a chorus as well as an array of props. Due to its unconventional structure, reviewers gave the play mixed reviews, with the play later being restaged by the Ubu Repertory Theater in New York City, 1998.

The play mostly originated from Chin's personal experiences. When the play was to be adapted on stage as a part of Renewable Women, the Public Entertainment Licensing Unit (PELU) initially refused to administer the license unless certain parts of the play were changed, but later allowed it to be presented uncut (through an appeal by Yeo) with an R-rating, on the condition that all publicity material for Renewable Women contained a warning "discouraging" those under 18 years old to view the play. This technically made both Second Chance and Details Cannot Body Wants the first R-rated play in Singapore, though only Details Cannot Body Wants was deemed offensive.

== Synopsis ==
The play is a 45-minute monologue presented by an unnamed character (played by Chin Woon Ping) exploring Asian women's societal, cultural, and emotional restrictions in a mixed culture society. It is divided into four concepts: (i) details - details of women's struggles in life, (ii) cannot - restrictions placed on women when creating their identity/destiny, (iii) body - male and female's perceptions of women's form, (iv) wants - women's wants.

Chin is supported by a three-person chorus as well as props such as a sex doll, an inflatable bra, masks, and risqué costumes to rant against feet binding, the use of a seductive voice, and other issues. She also uses a combination of Christmas carols, advertising jargons, rap music, Cantonese jingles, and pantuns, as well as alluding to Western and Asian cultural figures such as Billie Holiday, Édith Piaf, geishas, Mae West, William Shakespeare, Marlene Dietrich, The Platters, and Sutardji Calzoum Bachri.

== Production history ==
=== Creation ===
Chin Woo Ping was a lecturer at the National University of Singapore (NUS). When she was writing the play, Chin already had the play's four concepts already in mind, as well as two images: one of a woman crawling on the floor with a trail of pots and pans and the other of a breast examination, with the latter inspired from her friends undergoing mastectomies. Although some parts of the play came from Chin's personal experiences, she claims that it is not entirely autobiographical, adding:

"I didn't really set out to write a feminist play. But I always wanted to talk about women's intimate experiences which I feel nobody really deals with. One of the issues I wanted to address was that of the woman's body and what society imposes on us. We're made women, not born women."

Chin also felt the success of the play relied on gaining the audience's sympathy for struggles women face in society. Before it was performed, the play was published in 1992, alongside a collection of 69 poems written by Chin (with some dating back to the 1960s) in The Naturalization of Camellia Song & Details Cannot Body Wants, a poetry anthology.

=== Stage adaptation ===
External Image
- A photograph of the cast. Source: The Straits Times

When the play was to be adapted for the stage, director K. K. Seet, who was a friend of Chin, asked her to take on the lead role. Chin was initially hesitant as she had not acted in a long time but agreed to do so since she knew most of the play's songs by heart.

In June 1992, the Public Entertainment Licensing Unit (PELU) of the Singapore Police Force received a request from playwright Robert Yeo for a license of the double bill Renewable Women, which featured Details Cannot Body Wants and his play Second Chance. By August 1992, Yeo had not received a response and called PELU. PELU then revealed that a license would be granted only after certain scenes of the play had been omitted or changed. Yeo appealed against PELU and an agreement was reached. Although PELU was against the "adult language" and offensive gestures (such as a scene where a character grabs their crotch) used in the play, it nevertheless approved for the play to be fully staged with an R-rating (restricting those under 18 years old of viewing the material), though all publicity materials of Renewable Women needed to have a disclaimer discouraging patrons below 18 from attending. Even though the term "discourage" did not imply a full-on ban of those under 18, it also implied that the National University of Singapore Society (NUSS) was responsible for "discouraging" those under 18 to view the play.

Chin accepted the decision as she believed that the play is "essentially an ideological piece" but expressed confusion over PELU marking a scene involving a simulation of a breast examination as "offensive". Meanwhile, Seet commented that "the play's target audience is basically those who are above 18, so the disclaimer doesn't really affect us". It was reported that the public relations and activities manager of NUSS was "surprised" over PELU's decision but supported it as well. Even though the rating was for the double bill (which meant that both Second Chance and Details Cannot Body Wants would have been Singapore's first R-rated plays), in effect, only the latter was deemed "offensive" by PELU.

=== Premiere ===
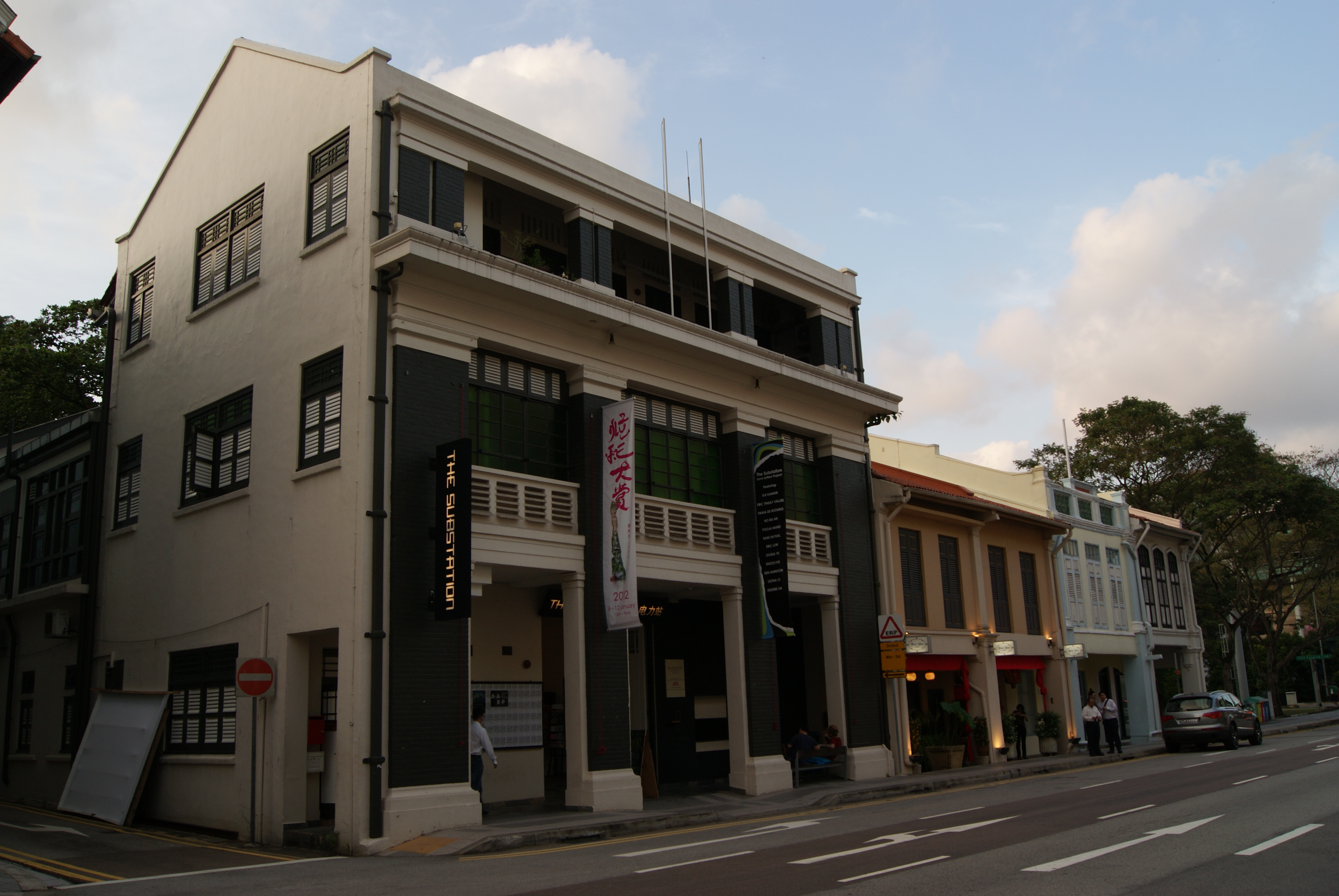
The Substation, where the play was first staged

The play premiered on 12 September 1992 at The Substation's Guinness Theatre with two shows, a matineé at 2 p.m. and a show at 8 p.m. Given the play's rating, three students from the National Institute of Education were instructed to check patrons who looked "suspiciously young" along with handling the tickets. Eight people were screened in total, all of whom were above 18 years old. Four of them were screened before the matineé and the other four before the 8 p.m. show. The Straits Times reported the show was sold out with more than 300 tickets sold, as well as the newspaper believing that the audience seemed mostly between 20 and 30 years old. There was another show at 8 p.m. the next day.

=== Reception ===
Due to its unorthodox form, the play received polarising reviews. Hannah Pandian of The Straits Times criticised the play for its unusual structure as well the monologues in the play, calling it "myopic" compared to Ovidia Yu's Three Fat Virgins and Woman On A Tree On The Hill. She did compliment the play's variety of music choices, though wondered if the play "would have engaged more than a tenth of the audience" without the music. In response to Pandian's criticism, David Britton of NUS's English Language and Literature Department gave an alternative perspective of the play, calling it "a thoughtful and witty consideration of an Asian woman emerging in a world of mixed sexual and cultural influences". Britton also said the writing is of "intense humanity" as not only "the demands of men and the restrictions of [Chin's] background are lampooned without mercy", but also "Chin is equally mocking of her own response to the situations she finds herself". Helena Grehan of La Trobe University wrote that "this work offers a myriad opportunities for raising issues about the ways in which performance can intervene to liberate, or offer a counterpoint to, current representations of race and gender through the use of an exciting contemporary non-realistic form". The Straits Times called it "an angst-filled 45-minutes [rant] in which [Chin] enacts and parodies the societal, emotional and cultural restrictions that come part and parcel with being a woman. The play is aggressive bold and strongly feminist".

=== Later developments ===
Following the performances, Chin hosted a reading of the play in Canada, which was aired on ABC Australia, where "the Australians really liked it", according to Chin. The play was also restaged in 1998 by the Ubu Repertory Theatre in New York. When asked in an interview with the New Straits Times in 1997 about her experience as the writer and lead actor of the play, Chin reflected that:

I haven't thought about [the play]. It was four years ago. I am very pleased to be part of Singaporean drama history ... I was reluctant at first to act in it and get all that publicity. But now that it's over and - thank God - I don't have to do it again, I am very pleased. I learned so much, not to mention the camaraderie and the pleasure of doing it under a very interesting director (K.K. Seet), who was great fun to work with... But at that time, I thought I might get into real trouble and lose all my credibility with my students. I thought: Oh my God, how am I am going to face my students after crawling on stage and saying all those terrible words?
