= Gourav =

Gourav is an Indian male given name (a variant of Gaurav) and may refer to:

- Adarsh Gourav (born 1994), Indian actor and singer
- Gourav Baliyan (born 2001), Indian freestyle wrestler
- Gaurav Chakrabarty (born 1987), Indian actor
- Gourav Choudhury (born 1999), Indian cricketer
- Gaurav Dhiman (born 1986), Indian cricketer
- Gaurav Gogoi (born 1982), Indian politician
- Gourav Menon (born 2004), Indian actor from the Malayalam film industry
- Gourav Mukhi (born 1998), Indian footballer

== See also ==
- Gouravam (disambiguation)Gourav Guin Memorial College
- Gourav Guin Memorial College, West Bengal, India
