= Aditya J Patwardhan =

Indian film director

Aditya J. Patwardhan
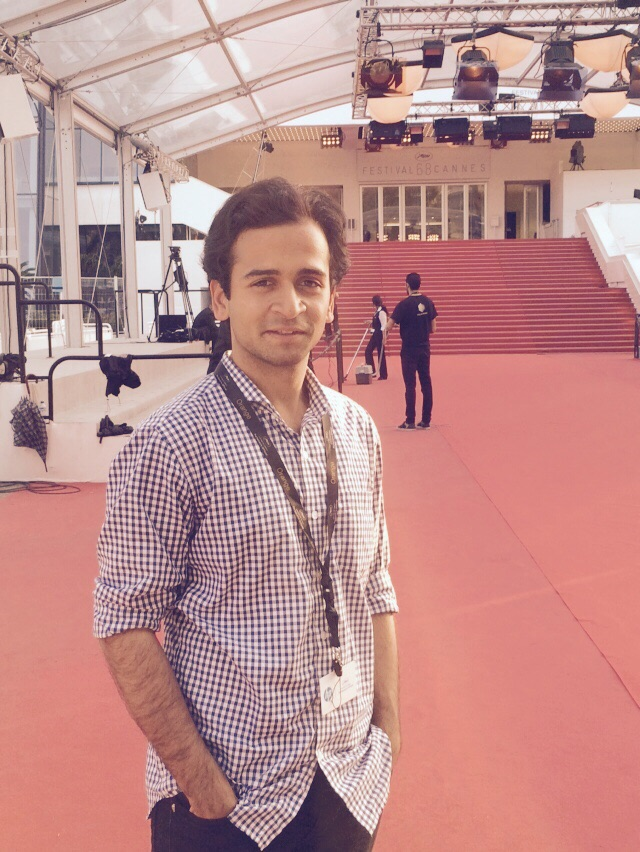
- Aditya J Patwardhan at the Cannes Film Festival 2015 in France
- Born: Aditya Jayant Patwardhan; September 12, 1989 (age 36); Indore, Madhya Pradesh, India
- Occupations: Director, Producer
- Website: www.patwardhans.org

Aditya J. Patwardhan is an Indian origin film director, producer and scriptwriter from Jaipur, India. He has representation with the Rough Diamond Productions of Julia Verdin. He is best known for his short film Red House by the Crossroads (2015) for which he won Best Short film Award at the Los Angeles Independent Film Festival Awards. and the film was also the part of the 2015 Cannes Short Film Corner (Cannes Court Metrage) Cannes Film Festival 2015. His popular music video "Katra Katra" is currently playing on MTV India in the Indie Pop category on national television in India.

== Biography ==
Aditya belongs to the lineage of the Patwardhan family of the Chitpavan community of Maharashtra. After completing Computer Engineering in 2011 from Jaipur, Rajasthan, Patwardhan started making short movies and songs for the Indian audience. Based in Los Angeles, filmmaker Aditya Patwardhan is known for a wide array of works, including documentaries, series pilots and short films. With a filmography that has been recognized internationally, his work has been showcased through prestigious mediums like the Cannes Film Festival, MTV, etc.

== Filmography ==
Director

- Only Vanilla (Short) 2016
- The Head of the Mouse TV serial 2016
- Torn (TV Movie)
- As Red as You (Short) 2016
- Red Souls (Short) 2016
- Last Will (Short) 2015
- Eastern Shores of the Western World (Documentary) 2015
- Rosethorn (Short) 2015
- Singularity (Short) 2015
- Red House by the Crossroads (Short) 2015
- Katra Katra: Music Video: song composed by Gaurav Bhatt (Short) 2015
- Vandarg (Short) 2014
- Mora Mann: Music Video: song composed by Gaurav Bhatt (Video short) 2013
- Kyu Jata Hai: Music Video: song composed by Gaurav Bhatt (Video short) 2013
- Society Black (Short) 2013

Presently he is working on one feature film and four short film including When Red is White, a.k.a. The Touch of Aurora with Brazilian actress Thaila Ayala in the lead role.

== Awards ==
- 2016 - Los Angeles Independent Film Festival Awards for best drama won for "Red house by the crossroads".
- 2016 - Best Dramatic Short Film at the DIY Film Festival, Los Angeles
- 2014 - Nominated : Festival De Cannes 2015 for "Red house by the crossroad.
