= Eunice Olsen =

Singaporean actress-politician (born 1977)

- Born: Eunice Elizabeth Olsen; 24 October 1977 (age 49); Singapore
- Occupations: Actress, host, musician, model, businesswoman
- Years active: 2000–present
- Website: euniceolsen.com

Eunice Elizabeth Olsen (born 24 October 1977) is a Singaporean actress, politician and beauty pageant titleholder. She was a Nominated Member of Parliament and also the winner of the Miss Universe Singapore 2000 pageant.

Olsen is a vocal supporter of women rights.

== Early life and education ==
Olsen was born in Singapore. She is the only child of Alice Yap and Francis Olsen. She is a Eurasian Singaporean; her mother is of Chinese and Portuguese descent and her father is Swedish. Olsen speaks in English, Swedish and Mandarin. Her parents enrolled her in Yamaha music school when she was three years old. She attended Woodlands Primary School, Singapore, St. Margaret's Secondary School, and the Anglo-Chinese Junior College. Olsen graduated with a Bachelor of Arts in Political Science and Philosophy at the National University of Singapore.

== Career ==
=== Miss Universe Singapore ===
In 2000, Olsen won the Miss Universe Singapore pageant.

=== Social causes ===
Her work with "at-risk" youth began with work at the Toa Payoh Girl's Home and the Andrew and Grace Home. In 2002, she became a member of the advisory council for the People's Association's youth movement T-Net Club (Teens Network Club). In 2001, she became a member of the Kebun Baru Youth Executive Committee. Olsen has worked with the National Volunteer and Philanthropy Centre and with Beyond Social Services' BABES program for pregnant teenagers. She promotes awareness of cervical cancer and for the Singapore Red Cross. She has also been a goodwill ambassador for World Vision, Habitat for Humanity, and the Muscular Dystrophy Association of Singapore.

She created the annual All Smiles Day in 2013 as a day of respite for caregivers of the Rare Disorder Society.

Olsen has worked in rural Cambodia building sanitation facilities for evacuated communities. She co-produced a movie about sex trafficking titled 3.50.

She developed a feminine hygiene program, Project Precious, to educate women in rural communities. The program has been adapted for use in Cambodia, India, Nepal, and the United States.

Olsen has served as a goodwill ambassador for the Embassy of Sweden in Singapore.

=== Media ===
In 2002, Olsen was selected to be the co-host of Singapore's version of the TV game show Wheel of Fortune. She went on to co-host three seasons of FRONT, an Arts Central production that examined Singapore's arts scene. In 2007, she was a judge on Channel 5's youth debate program, The Arena. She hosted Rouge in 2008, a talk show concerning Singaporean women, featuring a mix of celebrity interviews and real-life stories. Olsen made her English acting debut on Channel 5's first long-form English drama, Red Thread, and co-hosted a men's magazine lifestyle show on AXN, The Duke.

In August 2013, Olsen founded WomenTalkTV, an online talk show featuring extraordinary women from all over Asia. The show's goal is the social empowerment of Asian women. WomenTalkTV was nominated for an International Emmy Award in the Digital Program: Non-Fiction category in 2014. She hosted Channel NewsAsia's "Becoming Singapore", the flagship documentary for the Singapore Bicentennial in 2019. In 2020, Olsen hosted a web documentary series, Mundane Glory, which celebrated the 70th anniversary of the founding of the People's Republic of China for Mango TV.

Olsen has represented, in various capacities, commercial brands such as Omega, Motorola Electronics, Goldheart Jewelry, Redken, Nescafé Gold, Shell Petroleum Fuel Save Ambassador, BlackBerry Messenger, Physiogel, L'Oréal Lancome Genefique, The Body Shop.

=== Politics ===
In November 2004, Olsen was appointed a Nominated Member of Parliament (NMP) in Singapore. Her main role as an NMP was to highlight issues pertaining to youth and volunteerism. In the course of her term, she touched on issues like access to public transport for the disabled, legislation for child sex tourism, enhancing supervisory guidance for voluntary welfare organisations, and sex education in schools. In the 2005 parliamentary debate on Integrated Resort, Olsen called for stronger measures to address the social problems of compulsive gambling, including mandating a loss limit for casino patrons and requiring the casino operator to provide responsible gambling counselling services. She championed inclusivity for people with disabilities and called for the captioning of the Channel 5 English news program. Olsen served two terms and remained an NMP until 2009. She did not apply for a third term in parliament.

=== Advisory boards ===
Olsen is an advisor to Space for Humanity, a non-profit organisation headquartered in Denver, Colorado. She is currently a member of the National Museum of Singapore's advisory board and a management committee member of Club HEAL.

=== Author ===
Olsen published the children's book "I'm a Girl. See what I can be!" in 2018, which consists of a series of poems about ten women from the video series WomenTalk. The book is illustrated by 10 autistic Singaporean artists and designed by HATCH design. It was successfully crowdfunded on Indiegogo.

=== Speaker and moderator ===
Olsen has been engaged to speak globally on a wide range of topics from women's empowerment to leadership, resilience, and various social issues. She is a keynote speaker and has spoken at international events such as the Cartier Women's Awards, the United Nations, and LH Forum in France, as well as in educational institutions around the world such as Harvard and universities in India, and in various parts of Southeast Asia including Vietnam, the Philippines, and Singapore.

Olsen had also moderated various forums and events with high-profile individuals such as Helle Thorning-Schmidt, the former Prime Minister of Denmark, and panelists from the Swedish Embassy's Disability Forum.

On 6 May 2020, Olsen moderated an online webinar for Médecins Sans Frontières (Doctors Without Borders) titled "Live Chat on COVID-19: How MSF Responds to a Pandemic."

On 31 October 2020, Olsen co-hosted the first digital edition of The Purple Parade, which was streamed live on Facebook.

=== Music ===
In university, Olsen was part of a band and was president of the Electronic Music Lab at the Centre for the Arts. In 2004, she released an album in South Korea entitled Believe.

Olsen was part of a duo called 7 States. She was joined by music producer and sound designer Rennie Gomes of Yellowbox. Together, they have written a Christmas song, produced a kids' album, and scored a short film for one of Singapore's most acclaimed film directors, Royston Tan, titled Anniversary. 7 States has also written a song titled "Light" that they dedicated to the athletes of the 2010 Singapore Youth Olympic Games. 7 States recently performed, featuring Humaa Rathor, at the "From Singapore with Love" benefit concert 2011. This was in support of World Vision's earthquake relief work in China, Myanmar, and Japan.

== Personal life ==
Olsen discovered through a TV program called My Roots that her great-great-grandfather Oskar Pontus Olsson was born in Röra, Orust, Sweden in 1862. He became a sailor on ships that traveled back and forth to England. He eventually settled in Malaya around 1885 and lived in Malaya for 54 years. On 20 November 1928, he was naturalised as Oscar Olsen, a British citizen in Singapore.

While filming a bicentennial special of Becoming Singapore, she also learned that her grandfather from her mother's side, Yap Swee Kang, was an auxiliary fire service volunteer after World War 2.

Olsen is Catholic.

In 2018, she filed a police complaint over sexist remarks against Circles. Life advertisement, the ad, which was displayed at Raffles Place MRT station as part of a campaign by the digital telco operator, featured the words "@euniceolsen Would you rather French Kiss or take me out for the French Film Festival?"

== Filmography ==
=== Film ===
Year	Title	Role	Notes	Ref.
2008	Sing to the Dawn	Voice acting		
2010	Hunting Tales	Grace		
2010	The Smartemizer	Felicia		
2011	Red Numbers (红字)	Number 8 (8号的妈咪)		
2012	Ghost on Air	Pauline		
2013	3.50	Rebecca Wilson		
2016	The Last Night Inn	Miriam		

=== Television ===
Year	Title	Role	Notes	Ref.
2003	A Child's Hope	Dr. Joanne Su		
2003	No Place Like Home	Felicia		
2009	Red Thread	Carol Chong		
2010	Before I Was Awesome	Vivi		

=== Variety Show ===
Year	Title	Role	Notes	Ref.
2002–2003	Wheel of Fortune	Co-host		
2006–2007	FRONT	Co-host		
2007	The Arena	Judge		
2008	Rouge	Host	TV talk show	
2008	Show U Are The One	Judge		
2008	Fourplay	Host		
2009	The Duke	Co-host	TV talk show	
2011	Beauty Firstwhat the heck	Host		
2013–present	Womentalk TV	Host	TV talk show	
2019	Becoming Singapore	Host	Documentary	
2020	Mundane Glory (闪耀的平凡)	Host	Web documentary series	

== Bibliography ==
- Olsen, Eunice (2018). I'm a Girl. See what I can be!. Eunice Olsen Media. ISBN 978-981-11-7524-4.

== Awards and accolades ==
- 2000 Miss Singapore Universe
- 2006 Singapore Youth Award
- 2008 ASEAN Youth Award

Year	Ceremony	Category	Nominated work	Result
2014	International Emmy Awards	Digital Program – Non Fiction	WomenTalk TV	Nominated
2016	Hollywood Independent Documentary Award	Women filmmaker	WomenTalk TV	Winner
2016	Hollywood International Moving Pictures Film Festival	Documentary Short	WomenTalk TV	Winner
2016	Hollywood International Moving Pictures Film Festival	Women filmmaker	WomenTalk TV	Winner
2016	Los Angeles Independent Film Festival Awards	Documentary Short	WomenTalk TV	Winner
2016	Best Shorts Competition	Women filmmaker	WomenTalk TV	Award of Excellence
2016	Best Shorts Competition	Documentary Short	WomenTalk TV	Award of Excellence
2016	Indiefest Film Awards	Documentary Short	WomenTalk TV	Award of Merit
2016	Raindance Film Festival	Web Series	WomenTalk TV	Official Selection
2016	Best Shorts Competition	Humanitarian Award	WomenTalk TV	Award of Distinction
2017	Best Shorts Competition	Women filmmaker	WomenTalk TV	Award of Merit
2017	Taste Awards	Mini Film or Documentary	Tripvid	Official Selection
2019	Independent Publisher Book Award	Independent Spirit Award	I'm a Girl. See what I can be!	Winner
