= Ashraf Safdar =

Ashraf Safdar (born 29 February 1980) is a former television presenter and journalist from Singapore. He hosted the talk show Singapore Talking on MediaCorp Channel 5 in 2010, and served as a judge on the International Emmy Award-nominated first season of Channel 5's The Arena in 2007. Once a MediaCorp Overseas Scholar, he has also worked as a reporter for Channel NewsAsia and the Today newspaper. A majority of his working life has been spent in wealth management, specifically private banking, and data-analytics. He is an alumnus of Harvard Business School, King's College London and the University of Chicago.
