= WomenTalkTV =

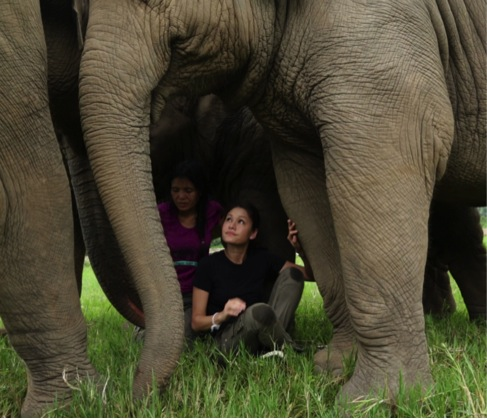
- A photo of Eunice Olsen for WomenTalk TV showing her in Thailand with an interviewee and her elephants
- Genre: Non-fiction; Talk Show
- Created by: Eunice Olsen
- Presented by: Eunice Olsen
- Country of origin: Singapore
- No. of seasons: 4

Production
- Production location: Singapore

Original release
- Release: August 2013

WomenTalk TV is a social enterprise founded by Eunice Olsen in August 2013 as a project of Olsen's House of Ou Studios. The series was nominated for an International Emmy Award in the Digital Program: Non-Fiction category in 2014, among numerous other awards and accolades.

WomenTalk TV publishes interviews featuring the accomplishments of everyday unsung women from all over Asia. WomenTalkTV has released nine videos in the first season. WomenTalk TV has since grown and introduced WomenTalk Pulse and WomenTalk Soul in 2016 to cover other aspects of women's empowerment.

== History ==
WomenTalkTV was created in 2013 by its host, Eunice Olsen, a former Nominated Member of Parliament (NMP) in Singapore as well as a television host and actress.

== Format ==
=== WomenTalk TV ===
WomenTalk TV interviews are hosted by Eunice. TV interviews focus on the particularly adversities faced by each of the women and how they have overcome them. All of the interviews also end with the women explaining what empowerment means to them. Each interview subject is able to nominate a charitable organisation to which viewers are encouraged to make donations. Viewers are then encouraged to upload their own videos documenting how they overcame personal struggles or that of other women they know.

=== WomenTalk Pulse ===
WomenTalk Pulse interviews feature the women alone. Pulse interviews showcase the projects that the women have initiated. Each interview also shares a call-to-action the woman would like to involve viewers, whether through donations, volunteering, or awareness. Similar to a TV episode, each woman shares their definition of empowerment.

=== WomenTalk Soul ===
Each WomenTalk Soul program and host focuses on a particular aspect of wellness: food and nutrition, exercise, happiness and wellness. Episodes are either conversational or hosted, each typically less than 2 minutes. WomenTalk Soul aims to be accessible for everyday women, whether they are mothers to children with special needs, working single ladies, or the elderly, introducing tips that cheap and easy to introduce into everyday lives, to allow viewers to achieve the full potential.

== WomenTalk TV (Episodes by Season) ==
=== Season 1 ===
1. Yip Pin Xiu
2. Lena Sim
3. Haslinah Yacob
4. Sangduen Chailert
5. Charm Tong
6. Xilca Alvarez
7. Cassandra Chiu
8. Rachel Chung
9. Doris Nuval

=== Season 2 ===
1. Rebekah Choong
2. Lai Yi Xuan
3. Serena Tan
4. Noeleen Heyzer
5. Sola Long
6. Carolyn Kan
7. Joanna See Too
8. Sam Lo
9. Marini Ramlam

=== Season 3 ===
1. Sharmilah Begum
2. Penhleak Chan
3. Theresa Goh
4. Alvina Neo
5. Aishah Samad
6. Yap Qian Yin
7. Anamika Subba
8. Maya Bhattachan
9. Kalyan Keo

=== Season 4 ===
1. Anthea Ong
2. Dolly Yeo
3. Ruth Komathi
4. Melissa Sarah Wee

== WomenTalk Pulse (Episodes by Season) ==
=== Season 1 ===
1. Priscilla Ong
2. Rachel Lin
3. Lim Xiang Lin
4. Melissa Yeung Yap
5. Poli Rai
6. Lily Low
7. Vanessa Ho
8. Mary Soo
9. June Chua

== WomenTalk Soul (Episodes by Program) ==
=== What's That Sizzle ===
==== Mom's Recipes ====
1. Manomani's Recipe

=== Wellness Through Self ===
1. Rachel's Soul Tip
2. A day in the life of: Anthea Ong
3. Lily's Soul Tip
4. Ruth's Soul Tip
5. Melissa's Soul Tip
6. Vanessa's Soul Tip

== Awards and nominations ==
In 2014, Olsen was presented with a Great Women of Our Time award from Singapore Women's Weekly magazine. That year WomenTalkTV was nominated for an International Digital Emmy Award in the non-fiction category. Since then, WomenTalk has received numerous award.

- 2016 Best Shorts Competition: Humanitarian Award – Award of Distinction, Award of Excellence – Documentary Shorts, Award of Excellence – Women Filmmaker
- 2016 Raindance Film Festival: Web Fest – Official Selection
- May 2016 Indie Fest Film Awards: Award of Merit – Documentary Short
- March 2016 Los Angeles Independent Film Festival Awards: Best Documentary Short
- March 2016 Hollywood International Moving Pictures Film Festival: Best Documentary Short, Best Women Filmmaker
- February 2016 Hollywood International Independent Documentary Award: Best Women Filmmaker
- 42nd International Digital Emmy Award: Digital Non-Fiction – Nominated
