= Gaurav Keerthi =

Singaporean businessman (born 1979)

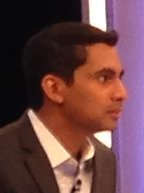
Gaurav in 2014

Gaurav Keerthi (born 2 April 1979) is an Indian-born Singaporean cybersecurity leader. He was a former TV personality, author, and brigadier-general who hosted numerous debate television shows in Singapore.

== Early life and education ==
Gaurav was born in India, and raised in Nigeria and Germany, before his family moved to Singapore when he was aged 10. He later took up Singapore citizenship.

Gaurav was educated St. Andrews Secondary School, Raffles Institution and Raffles Junior College in Singapore, before attending Stanford University in the United States where he graduated with a Bachelor of Arts degree in economics under the Singapore Armed Forces Overseas Scholarship. Upon his return to Singapore, Gaurav served as a helicopter pilot in the Republic of Singapore Air Force (RSAF).

He subsequently completed a Master of Public Administration degree at Harvard Kennedy School in 2014.

== Biography ==
In 2008, Gaurav served as one of the permanent judges on season 2 of the show The Arena, which was broadcast on Mediacorp Channel 5. He also appeared as a guest judge for one of the semi-finals of Season 1 of the show in 2007. In 2012, he served as the host and moderator for Season 2 of the debate show Bridging Asia: The Singapore Debates, broadcast on Channel NewsAsia.

Gaurav served as the President of Debate Association Singapore from 2006 to 2010, having previously served as the organisation's Vice-President from 2005 to 2006. In 2011, he published a book about debating entitled Think, Speak, Win: Discover the Art of Debate.

In 2019, Gaurav co-founded a community called better.sg, a non-profit targeted at bringing together busy talents from both technical and non-technical backgrounds to build innovative digital tools to address societal problems. Gaurav acts as the CEO for this organization.

== Bibliography ==
- Gaurav Keerthi (11 April 2011), Think, Speak, Win: Discover the Art of Debate, Marshall Cavendish International Asia Pte Ltd, ISBN 978-981-4634-97-7
