= Gaurav Bhatt =

Indian music director

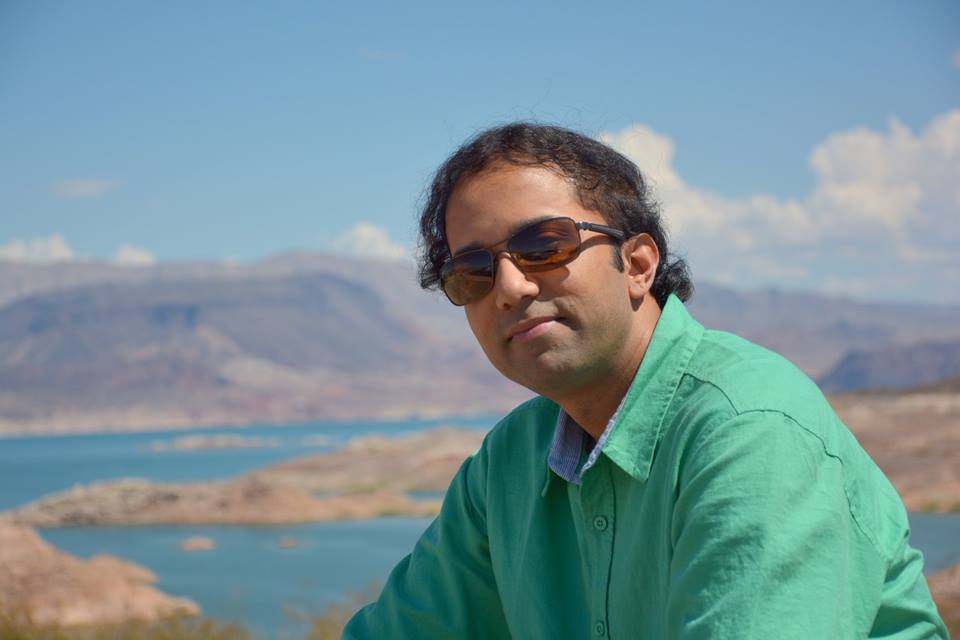
- Las Vegas, Nevada
- Born: Gaurav Bhatt
- Occupation(s): Music director, singer
- Relatives: Vishwa Mohan Bhatt; Salil Bhatt (Uncle); Krishna Bhatt (Uncle)

Gaurav Bhatt is a music director, singer, songwriter, and guitarist from Jaipur, India. He has an Indian classical background and sings in the traditional Indian style. Known for his fine work in Fusion (Indian Classical + Jazz), Romantic and Instrumentals melodies.

Gaurav's popular music videos "Sun Kabhi" (launched by actress Urvashi Rautela, "Katra Katra" and "Ye Faasley" are playing on MTV India in the Indie Pop category on national television in India. Composed songs for Kingfisher backstage and for various other channels. Accompanied Great maestros like Pt. Krishna Bhatt, Ghazal Maestros Ahmed and Mohammed Hussain, Shubha Mudgal. His band "Heat Strokes" was invited by Coke Studio.

== Background ==
Gaurav was born in Bikaner, Rajasthan. Gaurav is a MCA from the Birla Institute of Technology, Mesra. He has worked with top IT companies like Satyam, Wipro Infotech and Appirio to name some.

=== Discography ===
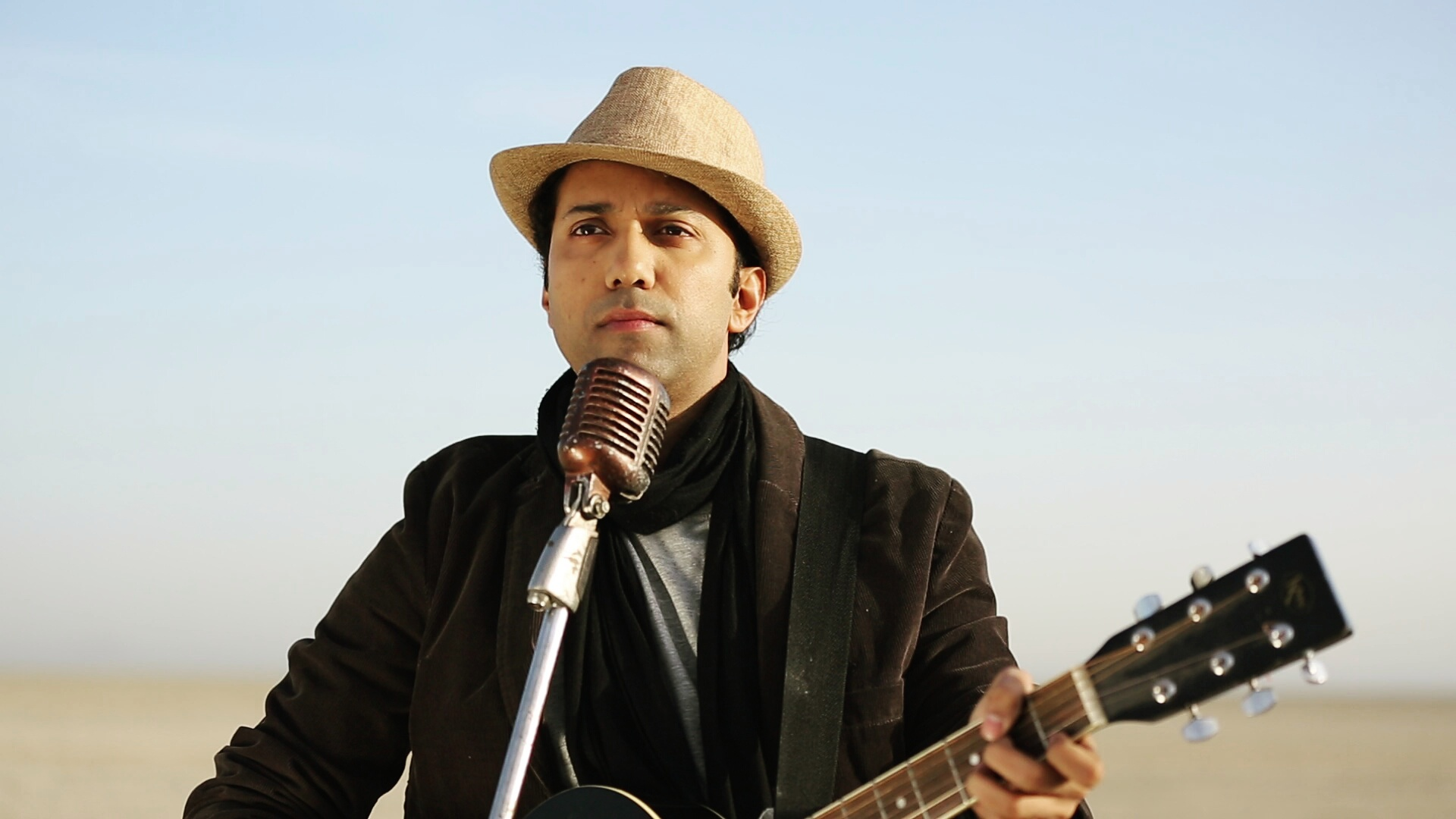
Sun Kabhi song shoot

Year	Title	Music director	Singer	Video Director
2021	Ye Raat Atak Gayi	Gaurav Bhatt	Gaurav Bhatt	Satvik Bhatt
2017	Aapse Mile Hue	Gaurav Bhatt & Shikha Bhatt	Gaurav Bhatt	Aditya J Patwardhan
2016	Sun Kabhi	Gaurav Bhatt	Gaurav Bhatt	Hiren Pandya Rahi
2015	Ye Faasley	Gaurav Bhatt	Gaurav Bhatt	Karan Raj Solanki
2015	Katra Katra	Gaurav Bhatt	Gaurav Bhatt, Shikha Bhatt	Aditya J Patwardhan
2015	Saawariya	Gaurav Bhatt	Gaurav Bhatt, Shikha Bhatt	Twilight Entertainment Pvt Ltd
2014	Bheed mein tanha	Gaurav Bhatt	Gaurav Bhatt	Hiren Pandya Rahi
2013	Mora Mann	Gaurav Bhatt	Gaurav Bhatt, Shikha Bhatt	Aditya J Patwardhan
