= Xinmin Secondary School =

- 新民中学; Sekolah Menengah Xinmin

Location
- 11 Hougang Ave 8 Singapore 538789; Singapore; 1.37243°N 103.883092°E

Information
- Type: Autonomous
- Motto: 精益求精，殷勤为众 Strive • Excel • Serve
- Established: 1 November 1945; 80 years ago
- Founder: Yap Fun Hong
- Session: Single Session
- School code: 3050
- Principal: Tan Soon Hui
- Gender: Co-educational
- Colour: Blue Yellow Red
- Website: xinminsec.moe.edu.sg

Xinmin Secondary School (XMS) is a co-educational secondary school in Hougang, Singapore with autonomous status.

== History ==
=== Sin Min High School (1945-1986) ===
Xinmin was founded as Sin Min Public School (公立新民学校) by Yap Fun Hong. (Note: Yap Fun Hong (叶帆风), may also be known as Yap Fun Fong, or Yeh Fan Feng in some news articles, and historical records.) Yap sold five of his pigs in order to raise money to buy three bungalows along Upper Serangoon Road. Lessons commenced for primary school education on 1 November 1945. Initial enrollment was capped at 620 students. Secondary classes were offered subsequently in 1956.

=== Xinmin Secondary School (1987-Present) ===
In 1987, Sin Min High School was restructured under the government from a Chinese-English integrated medium school into a government secondary school, with English as the medium of instruction. The secondary section of Sin Min High School was relocated to 11, Hougang Avenue 8 and renamed as Xinmin Secondary School, while the primary section was relocated the following year to 9, Hougang Avenue 8 and renamed as Xinmin Primary School.

Between 1992 and 1997, Xinmin Secondary School underwent changes to its curriculum under principal Goh Tong Pak, which included stricter rules and fostering of an inclusive culture. The school gradually gained reputation as one of the top neighbourhood schools in Singapore, being listed as one of the top 20 Value-Added Schools in Singapore from 1992 to 1993. In 2001, the school attained autonomous status from the Ministry of Education in recognition of its consistent excellence in holistic education.

Xinmin Secondary School moved into a holding campus off Sengkang West Avenue between January 2003 and December 2004 for modernisation of its Hougang campus.

In September 2005, Xinmin Secondary School became the first neighbourhood school to be accorded the School Excellence Award.

In 2010, in celebration of her 65th anniversary, Xinmin Secondary School broke the Singapore Book of Records by building the largest sculpture out of recycled cans.

In 2013, the school completed work on a Creative Arts Complex. Funds were raised by students through the annual Homecoming Day celebrations along with significant donations by notable alumni such as Dr George Quek, the founder and CEO of BreadTalk, and Chua Kee Teang of Mukim Investment.

On 13 August 2026, the school was evacuated after a bomb hoax. A 15-year-old girl was later arrested in connection to the case.

== Principal ==
Name of Principal	Years served
Yap Fun Hong	1945-1949
Heng Chin Soo	1950-1953
Tung Sey Yew	1953-1965
Chew Peng Leng	1965-1985
Teo Ting Kok	1986-1991
Goh Tong Pak	1992-1997
Lee Hak Boon	1998-2002
Low Ay Nar	2003-2006
Liew Wei Li	2007-2010
Ong Hong Peng	2011-2017
Tan Kuo Cheang	2018-2022
Tan Soon Hui	2023–present

== Gallery ==
Stone plaque at the entrance of Xinmin Secondary School

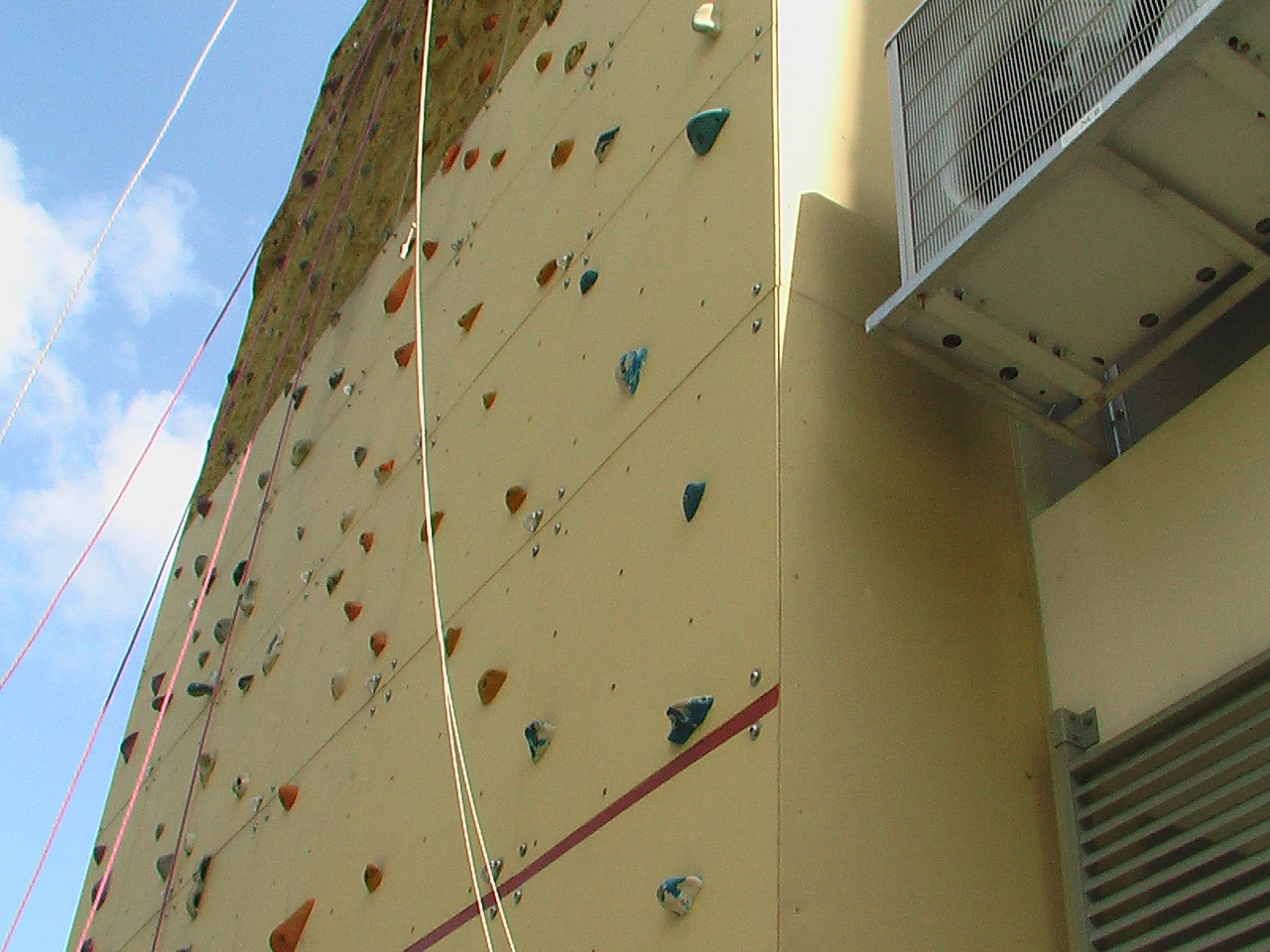
Rock climbing facilities in Xinmin Secondary School
