= K. K. Seet =

Singaporean academic

Seet Khiam Keong (Chinese: 薛謙恭; Pe̍h-ōe-jī: Siat Khiam-kiong; pinyin: Xuē Qiāngōng), better known as "K.K. Seet", is an academic, writer and theatre director from Singapore. He is a prominent figure in the arts scene in Singapore, where he is particularly known for being a judge at several high-profile competitions and serving on a number of arts-related committees.

== Academic career ==
Seet holds a PhD from the University of Exeter, and Master's degrees from the University of Edinburgh and the University of Toronto. He has been the recipient of a Fulbright Fellowship (as Visiting Fellow at the City University of New York), and two British Council Fellowships. Seet was responsible for establishing the Theatre Studies programme at the National University of Singapore (NUS) in 1992, and directed plays such as Details Cannot Body Wants, Singapore's first R-rated play. He was a tenured academic in the NUS Department of English Language and Literature for 22 years before choosing to take early retirement in June 2012.

Seet has written fifteen books. The Istana was presented to Blair House, the official guest house of the US President. Another book, In Unison, was presented to the Vice Premier of China. A third, Singapore Celebrates, is buried in a time capsule. His book Death Rites was twice dramatised for TV by Arts Central. Seet has also published in journals such as Camera Obscura: Feminism, Culture, and Media Studies, TDR: The Drama Review, Theatre Journal, Theatre Research International, and World Literature Today.

== Artistic career ==
Seet has chaired the Grants Committee and Selection Panel for the Singapore Cultural Medallion and the Young Artist of the Year Awards in Theatre. He advises on multidisciplinary arts at the National Arts Council Singapore, and has been a member of both the Drama Advisory Committee and the Films Appeal Committee for Singapore's Ministry of Information, Communication and the Arts (MICA).

Seet has judged numerous arts-related competitions, including the Singapore Literature Prize, the Singapore Writers Festival, The Straits Times Life! Theatre Awards, and the televised shows the Fame Awards and The Arena.

Seet has hosted the TV shows Film Art and Art Nation on Arts Central of MediaCorp TV12 in Singapore. and he was the face of the Speak Mandarin Campaign/ Huayu Cool in 2007.

Seet was conferred the Special Recognition Award by Singapore's Ministry of Information, Communication and the Arts (MICA) in 2005 for his contribution to culture and the arts. In July 2012, he was presented the Singapore Theatre Vanguard Award by the arts community of Singapore.

== Select bibliography ==
Non-fiction

- A place for the people (Times Books International, 1983) ISBN 9971650975
- Singapore celebrates (Times Editions, 1990) ISBN 9812041427
- The Istana (Times Editions, 2000) ISBN 9812320989
- Knowledge, imagination, possibility: Singapore's transformative library (National Library Board of Singapore and SNP Editions, 2005) ISBN 9812481079
- Prime: pride of passage (Keppel Land Limited and Straits Times Press, 2011) ISBN 9789812481894

Edited Volumes

- Old truths, new revelations: prizewinning ASEAN stories (Times Books International, 2001) ISBN 9812321829
- 5 under 25: prize-winning plays from the Writers' Lab (TheatreWorks, 2003) ISBN 9810488378

Journal Articles

- "Mothers and Daughters: Abjection and the Monstrous-Feminine in Japan's Dark Water and South Korea's A Tale of Two Sisters." Camera Obscura: Feminism, Culture, and Media Studies 24.2 (71) (2009): 139–159.
- "Theater and the politics of culture in contemporary Singapore." TDR: The Drama Review 47.2 (2003): 173–175.
- "Interpellation, ideology and identity: the case of Talaq." Theatre Research International 27.2 (2002): 153–163.
- "Discourse from the margin: A triptych of negotiations in contemporary Singapore English-language theatre." World Literature Today 74.2 (2000): 305–312.

Children's

- Death rites: tales from a wake (Times Books International, 1990) ISBN 9812041850
- A single tear: a fairytale for all ages (2010) ISBN 9789810871345
