= Gaurav Dhiman =

Indian cricketer (born 1986)

Gourav Dhiman
Personal information
- Born: 16 December 1986 (age 39); New Delhi, India
- Batting: Right-handed
- Bowling: Right-arm fast-medium
- Role: All rounder

Domestic team information
- Years: Team
- 2005/06–2006/07: Karnataka

Gourav Dhiman (born 16 December 1986) is an Indian former cricketer who played for Karnataka in domestic cricket, he bowled right-arm medium-pace and batted right-handed. At youth level, he represented India Under-15s, India Under-19s and Karnataka Under-19s. He played for the Bijapur Bulls in the Karnataka Premier League.

== Early life ==
He received his education at Jain University, Bangalore.
