= The Frangipani Tree Mystery =

2017 novel by Ovidia Yu

First edition

The Frangipani Tree Mystery is a 2017 novel by Ovidia Yu, published by Constable.

The novel is a murder mystery set in Singapore in 1936. The main character, an alumna of Mission School, Chen Su Lin, a Peranakan, is 16 years of age and had been afflicted by polio. Su Lin no longer has any parents. She becomes the nanny of a disabled girl, Dee-Dee Palin, the daughter of the Governor of Singapore, after dodging attempts to have her married off. The governor, Henry Palin, is the brother of Nessa. Dee-Dee had caught a fever at age seven and intellectually remained in that state. Su Lin's teacher, Vanessa "Nessa" Palin, who helped her escape the forced marriage, first arranges for her to work as a housekeeper for the chief inspector of the Singapore Police, Thomas Le Froy, who knows Singlish and has views on race ahead of most Britons in Singapore, who view other races as below them.

The previous nanny, an Irishwoman, with the name Charity Byrne, died from a neck injury sustained from falling off of a balcony a possible act of foul play. Therefore, Su Lin takes over Charity's job. Dee-Dee tells Su Lin that her stepmother Mary killed Charity and expressed a fear that Mary could kill them too. Dee-Dee therefore begs Su-Lin to kill Mary instead. While the governor contacts authorities to look into the matter, Su Lin decides to investigate Charity's death herself, working with Le Froy.

Olivia Ho of the Straits Times described Su Lin as an "efficient, resourceful heroine" while Le Froy "is a little bit too perfect".

== Reception ==
Olivia Ho rated the book 3.5 of 5 stars.

James Kidd of the South China Morning Post rated the book four of five stars, citing the "arresting plot" and the dynamism of the main characters.

Publishers Weekly stated that it was part of an "exceptional series" and gave the book a positive review.

Kirkus Reviews stated that it is "a delightful vintage whodunit bubbling with charm and an infectious curiosity about human nature."
