= Ovidia Yu =

Singaporean writer

Ovidia Yu (born 1961) is a writer from Singapore who has published award-winning plays and short stories. She has won several awards, including the Japanese Chamber of Commerce and Industry Singapore Foundation Culture Award (1996), the National Arts Council (NAC) Young Artist Award (1996) and the Singapore Youth Award (1997). She has had more than thirty of her plays produced and is considered one of the most well-known writers in Singapore, according to HarperCollins Publishers.

== Early life ==
Yu was born in 1961 to a middle-class family in Singapore. Her father was a doctor and her mother was a teacher. Yu attended Methodist Girls' School, where her mother taught, and developed a love for reading and writing at an early age. She became particularly interested in the characters that she read about and would continue their stories in her own 'sequels' to the books. She was writing her own short stories by the time she was ten years old.

Despite her interest in liberal arts, Yu was pressured into becoming a doctor by her parents and friends at school. Yu originally attended the National University of Singapore in pursuit of a medical degree, but soon dropped out to pursue literature instead. Before publishing any books, she had earned a living by writing scripts for corporate training videos and translating manuals for machinery.

== Writing ==
Yu is known for using humour and unique characters throughout her writing to explore changing roles and identities throughout society, especially for women. She is considered one of Singapore's first feminist writers and continues to write thought-provoking plays and novels.

Yu has mentioned that she enjoys writing about complex female characters. She believes that writing female characters with complexities and agency will communicate her message across cultures and nationalities.

Yu's historical “Crown Colony” mystery series has been optioned for TV by Poisson Rouge Pictures.

Yu's Aunty Lee series had been adapted for television by Singapore's Mediacorp as Aunty Lee’s Deadly Delights. Vernetta Lopez starred as the main character Aunty Lee.

== Personal life ==
Yu lives in and sets her plays, books and stories primarily in Singapore, although she deals with many issues especially trying to examine the lives of women and LGBTQ in Singapore. Yu also has epilepsy and carries notebooks around with her to counter memory lapses. These notebooks are also used for writing, as she gets many of her ideas for stories and plays by observing people in their everyday lives. When she is not writing, she practices yoga daily and volunteers at the SPCA weekly.

== Bibliography ==
=== Plays ===
Her plays include:

- 1987 : Dead on Cue
- 1988 : Round and Round the Dining Table
- 1988 : Face Values
- 1989 : Family Affairs
- 1990 : Mistress
- 1990 : Cupboards
- 1991 : Imagine
- 1991 : Ja
- 1992 : Three Fat Virgins
- 1992 : Wife and Mother
- 1993 : Be the Food of Love
- 1994 : Six Lonely Oysters
- 1995 : Three Fat Virgins Unassembled
- 1995 : The Land of a Thousand Dreams
- 1995 : Hokkien Mee
- 1996 : Playing Mothers
- 1996 : Every Day Brings its Miracles
- 1997 : Breast Issues
- 1999 : Viva Viagra
- 1999 : Life Choices
- 1999 : Haunted
- 2001 : Love Bytes
- 2002 : Love Bytes II (Love in a time of recession and newater)
- 2007 : Hitting (on) Women
- 2011 : Eight Plays

=== Fiction ===
Her works of fiction include:

- 1989 : Miss Moorthy Investigates
- 1990 : Mistress and Other Creative Takeoffs
- 1993 : The Mouse Marathon
- 2012 : The Mudskipper

Aunty Lee series

- 2013 : Aunty Lee's Delights: A Singaporean Mystery
- 2014 : Aunty Lee's Deadly Specials: A Singaporean Mystery
- 2016 : Aunty Lee's Chilled Revenge: A Singaporean Mystery
- 2017 : Meddling and Murder: An Aunty Lee Mystery

Su Lin series

- 2017 : The Frangipani Tree Mystery
- 2018 : The Betel Nut Tree Mystery
- 2019 : The Paper Bark Tree Mystery
- 2020 : The Mimosa Tree Mystery
- 2021 : The Cannonball Tree Mystery
- 2022 : The Mushroom Tree Mystery
- 2023 : The Yellow Rambutan Tree Mystery
- 2024 : The Angsana Tree Mystery

=== Non-fiction ===
Her works of non-fiction include:

- 1990 : Guiding in Singapore: A Chronology of Guide Events 1917–1990

== Awards ==
She has received the following awards:

- 1984 : First prize, Asiaweek Short Story Competition, for A Dream of China.
- 1985 : Second prize, Ministry of Community Development Short Story Competition
- 1993 : Scotsman Fringe First Award, Edinburgh Fringe Festival for The Woman in a Tree on a Hill
- 1994 : Highly Commended, National Book Council Development of Singapore (NBDCS) Drama
- 1996 : Japanese Chamber of Commerce and Industry (JCCI) Singapore Foundation Award for outstanding contribution to the development of arts
- 1996 : National Arts Council (NAC) Young Artist Award for Drama and Fiction
- 1997 : Singapore Youth Award (Arts and Culture)
- 2016 : S.E.A. Write Award for Singapore
