= HMAS Alatna =

1943 Royal Australian Navy fast supply/sea ambulance launch

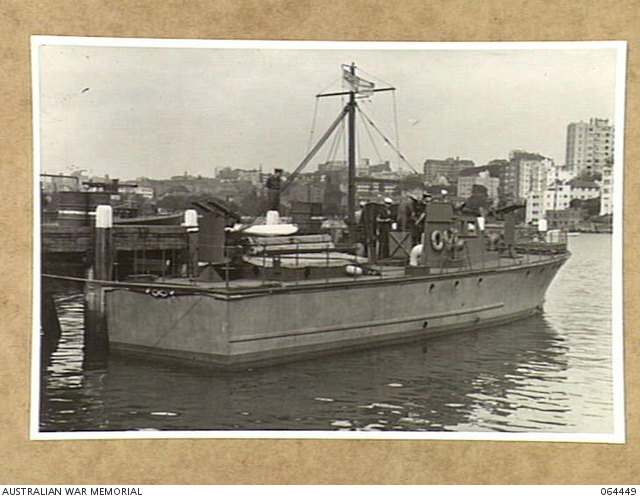
- HMAS Alatna in 1944

History
- Builder: Lars Halvorsen & Sons Pty Ltd, Sydney
- Completed: 1943

Australia
- Name: HMAS Alatna
- Commissioned: 2 February 1944
- Decommissioned: 1 January 1946
- Fate: Sunk in Balabac Strait, 1946

General characteristics
- Type: Diesel Motor Launch
- Displacement: 28 tons
- Length: 62 ft (18.90 m) o/a
- Beam: 14 ft 5 in (4.39 m)
- Propulsion: 3 × diesel engines 275 horsepower (205 kW)
- Speed: 20 knots (37 km/h; 23 mph)
- Complement: 8 crew
- Armament: 3 x Vickers machine gun

HMAS Alatna (AM 1475) was a motor launch that served in the Royal Australian Navy as a reconnaissance and transport vessel during World War II and the post war period, until her sinking following a collision in the Balabac Strait on New Years Day 1946.

== Design and construction ==
Alatna was built in Sydney by Lars Halvorsen & Sons Pty Ltd in 1943, initially as an Army motor launch, before being transferred to the Navy along with her sister ships, Karina, Misima and Nyanie to serve with the Services Reconnaissance Department (SRD). She was a plywood vessel 62 ft (18.90 m) in length, armed with three Vickers machine guns, carried a crew of 8 and could reach 20 knots (37 km/h; 23 mph) from her three diesel engines.

== Service ==
Alatna was commissioned on 2 February 1944 in Sydney under the command of Lieutenant Hubert Edward ‘Ted’ Carse, RANVR, before travelling to Darwin, where she was taken under command by Sub Lieutenant William McLeod, RANVR on 10 March. She was intended to serve alongside MV Krait with the SRD, landing special forces onto Timor and other islands to the north of Australia. Her initial commanding officer Carse had previously commanded Krait during Operation Jaywick, a covert special forces raid on Singapore in September 1943. However after exploring reefs and islets in the Timor Sea throughout March, looking for suitable supply dumps for the SRD. She was quickly found to be unsuitable for the task.

Alatna's plywood hull often leaked, and her engines were unreliable, leading to her spending April through June in Darwin undergoing repairs. Repairs soon became a running problem for the vessel, with two missions to Ashmore Reef and Rote Island in July and August ending in failure due to bad weather and engine problems. She would return for maintenance regularly over the next six months, with Sub Lieutenant Thomas Dann, RANVR assuming command on 27 January 1945.

By March 1945, a major re-fit of Alatna was undertaken, with her hull and engines fixed or replaced. As well as new telegraph equipment fitted. By August, she was ready to join the fleet again, joining a convoy to Morotai in modern day Indonesia on 21 August. Joining her were HMA ships Grass Snake, Sea Snake, sister ship Karina and Krait, as well as the British minesweeper HMS 2046. While fighting on Morotai had ceased on 15 August, the waters between Darwin and Morotai were still under Japanese control.

Alatna and her other convoy ships arrived safely on 29 August, where she carried out habour support duties. She was present during the surrender of the Japanese Second Army at Morotai on 9 September 1945. She would then travel with Grass Snake to Manado, where over four days she assisted with evacuating former prisoners of war. Before again travelling, this time to Balikpapan to embark soldiers of the 21st Brigade, (7th Division), the soldiers were soon disembarked at Makassar. Where they oversaw the disarmament of Japanese troops and evacuation of former prisoners of war, largely British who had been on vessels sunk in 1942.

Alatna's small size came in handy at Makassar, as anti-dutch beliefs were strong in the local population, so larger vessels were seen with distrust. Alatna and other smaller vessels instead ferried the evacuees from the mainland to the larger vessels anchored off shore. She then spent September and October piloting larger vessels into the port, due to the Japanese minefield left behind.

Alatna soon ran out of tasks to complete in the local area, and a decision was made to gift her to the British Borneo Civil Administration in December 1945. She was taken under tow at Balikpapan by HMAS Cessnock, before being handed over to the destroyer HMAS Quickmatch at Tawi-Tawi Island on 30 December, bound for Labuan.

== Sinking ==
While travelling to Labuan, Quickmatch with Alatna in tow traversed the Balabac Strait on the morning of 1 January 1946. An American merchant vessel Marine Runner was following the two vessels, when she made a course alteration that put her on a collision course. Evasive maneuvers by the destroyer prevented a collision with her, however the merchant vessel struck Alatna and continued on her path without stopping.

Seven of the crew and the ships cat were able to be saved, after Quickmatch launched their boats for the rescue, but Able Seaman Raymond Dodgson was presumed drowned a day short of his 19th birthday. An inquiry into the collision believed that the crew of Marine Runner had not seen the small motor launch and after a course change, they did not post lookouts or man the bridge.
