= Operation Agas =

Allied World War II special operation in Borneo

- Part of the Japanese occupation of North Borneo during World War II
Date	March – October 1945
Location	Borneo 5.8511827°N 117.9187985°E
Result	Allied victory

Belligerents
Empire of Japan	Australia

Units involved
37th Army (elements)	Z Special Unit

Strength
	44 personnel

Operation Agas was a series of reconnaissance operations carried out by Australia's Z Special Unit in 1945 during the final stages of World War II. This operation was part of the Borneo Campaign, supporting Allied operations to secure North Borneo (present day Sabah). Another closely related operation codenamed Semut was carried out in Sarawak. Both operations combined and relayed their intelligence through the Stallion Project to Australian forces and carried out guerrilla warfare against the Japanese in the region with support of the local population. A total of five operations were undertaken, commencing in March 1945, continuing up to September and October 1945.

== Background ==
Early in the Pacific War, the Japanese had landed in north-west Borneo and had quickly captured the area's vital oilfields, which had begun contributing to their war effort by 1943. Allied efforts to interdict the flow of oil had been limited largely to aerial bombing in the intervening period as Allied ground efforts had focussed upon the drive on the Philippines. Nevertheless, by late 1944 – early 1945 the Allies had begun planning operations to retake the area. Allied operations to re-capture Labuan and Brunei Bay were scheduled for mid-June 1945. To support this, Operation Agas was launched in March 1945 by Australian Services Reconnaissance Department (SRD), utilising Z Special Unit personnel. The operation had two main objectives: to gather intelligence and to train the indigenous people to undertake a guerrilla campaign against the Japanese. Subsequently, a series of five operations were undertaken in the Japanese occupied areas of North Borneo in the final stages of the war under the auspices of Operation Agas – the Malay word for sandfly – which were undertaken in conjunction with Operation Semut in Sarawak. The Japanese troops occupying north Borneo at the time were drawn from the 37th Army.

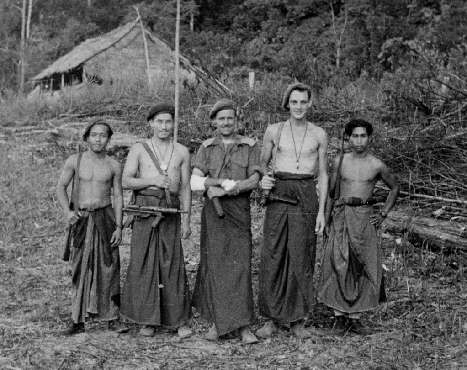
The Agas 1 party with Major F. G. L. Chester

Planning for covert operations in Borneo by Allied forces had begun in December 1941 when Second Lieutenant P. M. Synge, a British intelligence officer who had undertaken an expedition in Sarawak in 1932, proposed sending a small group of officers into the area to organise a guerrilla force with the aim of disrupting Japanese efforts to exploit the vital oilfields. While Synge's proposal was not acted upon at the time, several other British officers made similar proposals. Throughout 1942 and 1943, British and Australian Army planning staff worked to exchange information and sought out personnel who might be suitable. In October 1943 and January 1944, a reconnaissance operation was undertaken around Labian Point, Lahad Datu, designated Operation Python. Conducted in two phases, the operation was tasked with relaying information about Japanese shipping and supporting Filipino guerrillas who were working in the area under an American officer. Both phases were concluded without much success. In late 1944 and early 1945, the Allies began planning a campaign to retake Borneo. As a result of the commitment of US forces to the recapture of the Philippines, the task of recapturing Borneo was allocated primarily to Australian ground forces.

== Execution ==
=== Agas 1 ===
In early March 1945, Major F. G. L. Chester, who led the Operation Python 1 previously, landed at the Labuk Bay, Sandakan, along with six other personnel. Having been carried from Darwin aboard the submarine USS Tuna, the party had paddled 10 miles (16 km) ashore in rubber inflatable craft. Kayaks were then used to carry out reconnaissance in the smaller waterways along the shore of Labuk Bay. They were able to establish a signals station at Lokopas and a hospital was established at Jambongan Island for the guerrillas. Information such as the train schedule to and from Beaufort, cargo movements, and details of local timber milling and railway operations was collected. Agas 1 also made contact with two Chinese men named Chin Sang and Ah Lee. They refused long-term cooperation with Agas 1 members but were willing to provide the details of Japanese movements in the area. Information was also sought about Allied prisoners of war (POWs) being held at Sandakan, although they were unable to get close enough to the camp to make a thorough investigation, and ultimately reported in error that the camp had been abandoned. In reality around 800 prisoners remained, and a planned rescue operation was cancelled as a result of the report.

=== Agas 2 ===
Two months later, Agas 2, a five-man team led by Major R. G. P. N. Combe, landed at Paitan Bay, Sandakan, to obtain information in support of the Australian assault on Brunei Bay and Labuan. Arriving by parachute in early May, the team set up an intelligence network and undertook guerrilla activities at the Pitas, Kudat; throughout the operation, they were reinforced by nine other personnel and undertook a number of raids around Banggi Island, Pitas, Marudu Bay, Dampirit and Pituru. Finally, in the closing stages of the war, Kudat was captured when the Japanese withdrew without resistance.

=== Agas 3 ===
Commencing on 21 June, Agas 3, also led by Chester, focussed its activities at Jesselton–Keningau–Beaufort sector. Agas 3 was later incorporated into the Stallion Phase IV network, an intelligence sharing network between Semut and Agas. The Stallion Phase IV project focused their reconnaissance on the Kimanis Bay area. In mid August, seven reinforcements were dropped by parachute on the Ranau Plateau by the Royal Australian Air Force's No. 200 Flight, to assist in locating prisoners of war who had escaped from Ranau camp. Agas 3 remained in their area until being withdrawn in mid-October 1945.

=== Agas 4 and 5 ===
Two more Agas operations followed in July: Agas 4, consisting of three personnel under Major R. Blow, landed by PT boat in the Semporna area on 21 July. They were reinforced by some personnel from the British North Borneo Constabulary and the crew of a Royal Australian Navy whaleboat. Meanwhile, personnel from Agas 5 under Major J. McLaren, landed around Lahad Datu on 27 July.

On 7 August, three Agas 5 personnel and five local guerrillas moved to Talesai, to the north of Darvel Bay. Agas 4 was tasked with collecting information about Japanese troops in the Tawau–Mostyn and Lahad Datu area, ascertaining their strength, movements and combat capability. They also undertook minor harassment attacks and worked to recruit local guerillas, and continued operations until October 1945. Agas 5 also gathered intelligence information, establishing and maintaining contact with several agents in their area, and worked to establish hospitals and casualty collection points in the jungle, and worked to relieve food shortages in the area. They ceased operations on 10 September 1945; after this, Agas 5 personnel concentrated with Agas 4 around Semporna where a Catalina was to extract them.

== Aftermath and impact ==
Assisted by the Agas and Semut operations, the Australian 9th Division was able to secure north Borneo, with major combat ending largely by July 1945. As the regular forces remained confined to the coastal areas, the Japanese moved inland and the irregular forces continued to play a role, calling in airstrikes on the withdrawing Japanese and working to restore civil administration. Following the cessation of hostilities, the regular Australian troops remained in north Borneo to restore law and order, and to facilitate the surrender of Japanese troops. Extensive civic actions began even before the end of the war, with efforts being turned to rebuilding the oil facilities and other damaged infrastructure, establishing schools, providing medical care to local civilians and restoring the water supply. Martial law was initially imposed, but eventually a civil administration was established under the British Borneo Civil Affairs Unit.

A total of 44 personnel took part in the Agas operations. Overall, the Agas operations were able to supply reliable information to Australian forces. The total estimated number of Japanese troops reported at 31,000 in May 1945 was not too far off the official number given in October 1945 (35,000). It also provided the crucial information that the Japanese in the area intended to evacuate the coast and move into the North Borneo interior.

In analysing the operation, Alan Powell has stated that "Agas succeeded politically", but "...had little direct military value and failed as a POW rescue operation". This was due to the general "apathy, fear, and the desire to return home" expressed by the local guerrilla units after the failed 1943 Jesselton Revolt. This had prevented the guerrilla force from launching significant attacks against the retreating Japanese. Although AGAS 1 provided information about the Sandakan Death March, it did not execute any rescue missions for the POWs. Nevertheless, it provided information that guided successful bombing raids at Sandakan. It also trained 250 people as part of the local guerrilla force, and more than 2,000 local inhabitants were able to receive treatment from the hospital set up by the mission. The effectiveness of the Agas-recruited guerrillas was limited, although around 100 Japanese were killed by these personnel.

Agas 2 also successfully set up a local guerrilla force of 150 to 250 people and successfully contacted Chinese guerillas at Kota Belud. It also set up a hospital in the Lokopas area for the local population. Meanwhile, Agas 3 was proved largely unsuccessful. Many of its objectives were not met due to the high concentration of Japanese troops in the area, which numbered up to 6,000 troops between Jesselton and Beaufort. The Chinese in this region also refused to provide any cooperation because of their fear of retaliation after the failed Jesselton Revolt in 1943. Nevertheless, intelligence gathered from this region enabled the Allies to avoid a direct assault against the Japanese during Operation Oboe Six (the Battle of North Borneo).
