= G. S. Carter =

Australian Army officer

Gordon Senior Carter
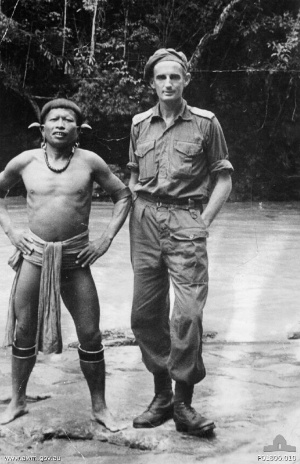
- Australian War Memorial caption: "Informal portrait of Major G. S. Carter DSO and a leading member of the Brunei native underground movement after Major Carter had parachuted into the country."
- Born: Gordon Senior Carter; 20 April 1910
- Died: 1 August 1988 (aged 78)
- Military career
- Allegiance: United Kingdom Australia
- Branch: British Army; Australian Army
- Rank: Major
- Nickname: Toby
- Service number: VB336939; QX48608 (Q142766)
- Unit: Royal Australian Engineers Z Special Unit
- Commands: Operation Semut II
- Conflicts: World War II
- Awards: Distinguished Service Order

Major Gordon Senior 'Toby' Carter DSO (20 April 1910 – 1988) was a New Zealand surveyor and road engineer who worked in Sarawak, Borneo prior to World War II for Shell Oil. He enlisted with the British Army during the war, and served in the Royal Australian Engineers and later in Z Special Unit in Borneo, where he was the Officer in Command of the Semut II operation in the Kelabit Highlands of Sarawak. In 1962 Carter had the initial idea for and was the driving force behind the establishment of both the Kinabalu National Park and the Kundasang War Memorial and Gardens near Mount Kinabalu in Sabah.

== Life ==
Carter was educated at Mount Albert Grammar School, Auckland. Described as "a courteous, soft-spoken, long, lean New Zealander" Carter worked for Shell as an oilfield surveyor in Sarawak, and had pre-war experience of the Baram-Tinjar River basin there. Carter avoided internment on the Japanese invasion of the country in December 1941 (it is unclear whether he escaped or was out of the country at the time); he joined the Royal Australian Engineers in Brisbane in 1942 and saw service in the New Guinea campaign before joining Z Special Unit and later transferring to the British Army and the Services Reconnaissance Department.

Initially in charge of all Semut operations in Borneo, difficulties with the notoriously prickly Major Tom Harrisson led to the splitting of the operation into several units, Semuts I (led by Harrisson), II (led by Carter), III (led by Major W. Sochon, DSO) and IV. Carter was inserted by parachute drop on 16 April 1945 with seven other members of Z Special Unit to the Baram River area, near Long Akah. The area was probably chosen as Carter had pre-war experience of it.

As with other Z Special Unit operations, Carter's Semut II unit was involved with intelligence gathering, and the recruitment of and training of local people in the guerilla war against the Japanese. The native intelligence network established by Semut II provided information on Japanese dispositions and troop movements in the Labuan, Miri, Lutong, Kuala Belait and Upper Rejang areas; enemy outposts, hideouts and depots were known, as well as cross-country evacuation routes that the Japanese might use. The 350-strong native guerilla force organised, armed and led by Semut II engaged with skirmished with the enemy. On 6 May 1945 Semut II captured the Japanese wireless station at Long Lama in the Baram. Carter noted that "In all our Guerilla activities we were most fortunate in not having sustained the loss of a single European, and native casualties had been light. On the other hand, casualties inflicted on the enemy had been considerable." In 1947 Carter was awarded the Distinguished Service Order for his service in Sarawak. He had originally been recommended for appointment as Officer of the Order of the British Empire by Colonel H. A Campbell, director, Services Reconnaissance Department, but this recommendation was upgraded to the DSO by General Thomas Blamey. The recommendation remarks:

He established complete control over an area of 6,000 square miles and organised native relief and medical aid throughout. His intelligence network and efficient W/T [radio] organisation was responsible for much valuable information on enemy movements reaching 9 Aust Div prior to OBOE VI operation. During his period of operations Major Carter's forces killed 258 Japs and captured 2. His full strength of white personnel was 17. His own casualties were 5 guerillas [sic] killed. The excellent results reported above were obtained mainly by Major Carter's enthusiasm, ability and self-sacrifice. His service and bearing throughout was a fine example and encouragement to every member of his party. On several occasions this officer personally led his guerilla bands into attacks which inflicted heavy casualties upon the enemy.

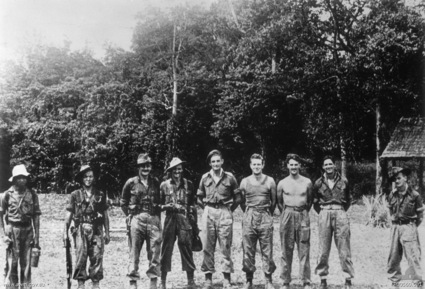
Carter (centre) with Semut II team members at Long Akah, May 1945.

According to one account, "Carter was assessed as an idealist, his overall actions being motivated by operational orders and a compassion for the goodwill of the natives. Intelligence gathering and guerrilla training were carried out as normal duties, but the Major never lost sight of the long term strategy of fostering goodwill, civil administration where possible for the return of British colonial rule." The local people with whom he worked called him "King Carter".

Carter was withdrawn on surrender day to go to the Batu Lintang prisoner of war and civilian internment camp in Kuching, Sarawak to assess the civilian internees and assist in their evacuation to Labuan, where the AIF had two field hospitals, a casualty clearing station and a reception camp for released POWs and internees. Carter was chosen for this role as he knew many of the Sarawak oil field people and fellow New Zealand surveyors from North Borneo.

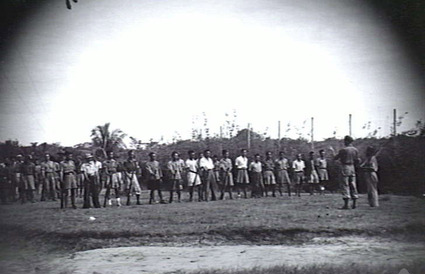
Carter holding a parade of local forces, Marudi, July 1945

In 1958 Carter was one of the senior Shell managerial staff at Seria, Brunei. Despite his wartime difficulties with Harrisson, they remained friends. In his 1959 book, World Within: A Borneo Story, Harrisson noted "Toby Carter and I kept our eye in, recently, by climbing Mt Kinabalu ... we stayed for days in the tiny Pakka Cave, at 10,000 ft. under the summit, looking out over the vast expanses of inside Borneo, once our peculiar empires."

In 1962 Carter initiated and was the driving force behind the establishment of both the Kinabalu National Park and the Kundasang War Memorial and Gardens near Mount Kinabalu in Sabah. The Kundasang Memorial and Gardens commemorate the 2,428 Australian and British prisoners who died during World War II at the Sandakan POW Camp, and the casualties of the three infamous forced death marches from Sandakan to Ranau. It also serves as a tribute to the many local people who risked their lives while aiding the prisoners of war.

Carter married his wife Winifred on 12 November 1936 and they had at least one child, born in 1941. Carter died in Rotorua on 1 August 1988. In his 2001 autobiography Blood on Borneo Jack Wong Sue discusses Carter and his wartime activities.

== See also ==
- Tom Harrisson
- Roland Griffiths-Marsh
- Jack Wong Sue

== Bibliography ==
- Carter, G. S. (1946) "Sarawak Adventure" New Zealand Surveyor Vol 19, No 3, 246–257. December 1946
- Carter, G. S. (1958) A Tragedy of Borneo 1941–45: a proposal for commemoration G. S. Carter: Kuala Belait, Brunei
