= Borneo campaign =

Last major Allied campaign in the South West Pacific Area during World War II

- Part of South West Pacific theatre of World War II
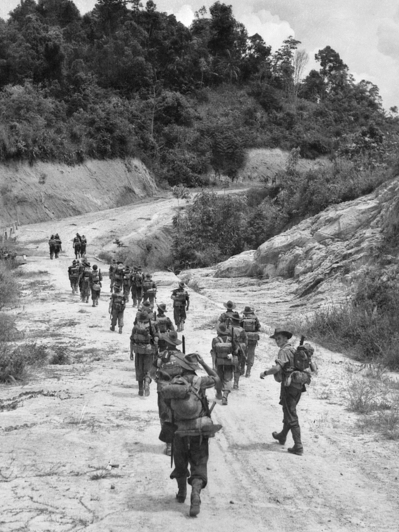
- Australian troops advancing towards Brunei
Date	1 May – 30 August 1945
Location	British Borneo and Dutch Borneo
Result	Allied victory

Belligerents
Allies: Australia; United States; United Kingdom: North Borneo; Netherlands: Dutch East Indies	Japan

Commanders and leaders
(United States) Douglas MacArthur (Australia) Leslie Morshead (United States) Thomas Kinkaid	(Empire of Japan) Michiaki Kamada (Empire of Japan) Masao Baba

Strength
c. 74,000	32,000

Casualties and losses
2,100 casualties	4,700 casualties

The Borneo campaign or Second Battle of Borneo was the last major Allied campaign in the South West Pacific Area during World War II to liberate Japanese-held British Borneo and Dutch Borneo. Designated collectively as Operation Oboe, a series of amphibious assaults between 1 May and 21 July 1945 were conducted by the Australian I Corps, under Lieutenant-General Leslie Morshead, against Imperial Japanese forces who had been occupying the island since late 1941 – early 1942. The main Japanese formation on the island was the Thirty-Seventh Army under Lieutenant-General Masao Baba, while the naval garrison was commanded by Vice-Admiral Michiaki Kamada. The Australian ground forces were supported by US and other Allied air and naval forces, with the US providing the bulk of the shipping and logistic support necessary to conduct the operation. The campaign was initially planned to involve six stages, but eventually landings were undertaken at four locations: Tarakan, Labuan, North Borneo and Balikpapan. Guerrilla operations were also carried out by Dayak tribesmen and small numbers of Allied personnel in the interior of the island. While major combat operations were concluded by mid-July, localised fighting continued throughout Borneo until the end of the war in August. Initially intended to secure vital airfields and port facilities to support future operations, preparatory bombardment resulted in heavy damage to the island's infrastructure, including its oil production facilities. As a result, the strategic benefits the Allies gained from the campaign were negligible.

== Background ==
Prior to World War II, Borneo was divided between British Borneo, in the north of the island and Dutch Borneo in the south; the latter formed part of the Netherlands East Indies (NEI). As of 1941, the island's population was estimated to be 3 million. The great majority lived in small villages, with Borneo having less than a dozen towns. Borneo has a tropical climate and was mainly covered by dense jungle at the time of World War II. Most of the coastline was lined with mangroves or swamps.

Borneo was strategically important during World War II. The European colonisers had developed oil fields and their holdings exported other raw materials. The island's location was also significant, as it sat across the main sea routes between north Asia, Malaya and the NEI. Despite this, Borneo was under-developed, and had few roads and only a single railroad. Most travel was by watercraft or narrow paths. The British and Dutch also stationed only small military forces in Borneo to protect their holdings.

Borneo was rapidly conquered by the Japanese in the opening weeks of the Pacific War. The purpose of this operation was to capture the oilfields and guard the flanks of advances into Malaya and the NEI. Japanese troops landed at Sarawak on 16 December 1941, where a single battalion of British Indian troops fought a delaying action over several weeks, damaging vital oil installations. Meanwhile, on 11 January 1942, Japanese troops landed on the island of Tarakan, while parachute troops carried out a drop on the Celebes the following day; the small Dutch garrison managed to destroy some of the infrastructure before eventually being overwhelmed. The destruction of these facilities led to harsh reprisals against civilians, particularly at Balikpapan where between 80 and 100 Europeans were executed.

In the aftermath, the Imperial Japanese Army (IJA) administered the occupied British North Borneo and the Imperial Japanese Navy (IJN) was responsible for Dutch Borneo. The garrison forces on the island were very small until mid-1944. During the occupation, the local population was subjected to harsh treatment. For example, on Tarakan large numbers of people were conscripted as labourers, the economy was disrupted, and food became increasingly scarce. In October 1943, an open revolt by local Dayak tribesmen and ethnic Chinese initiated the Jesselton revolt which was violently suppressed with hundreds being executed. In the aftermath, many more died from diseases and starvation as Japanese policies became even more restrictive on the local population. Japanese forces conducted a number of other massacres during their occupation of Borneo.

== Planning ==
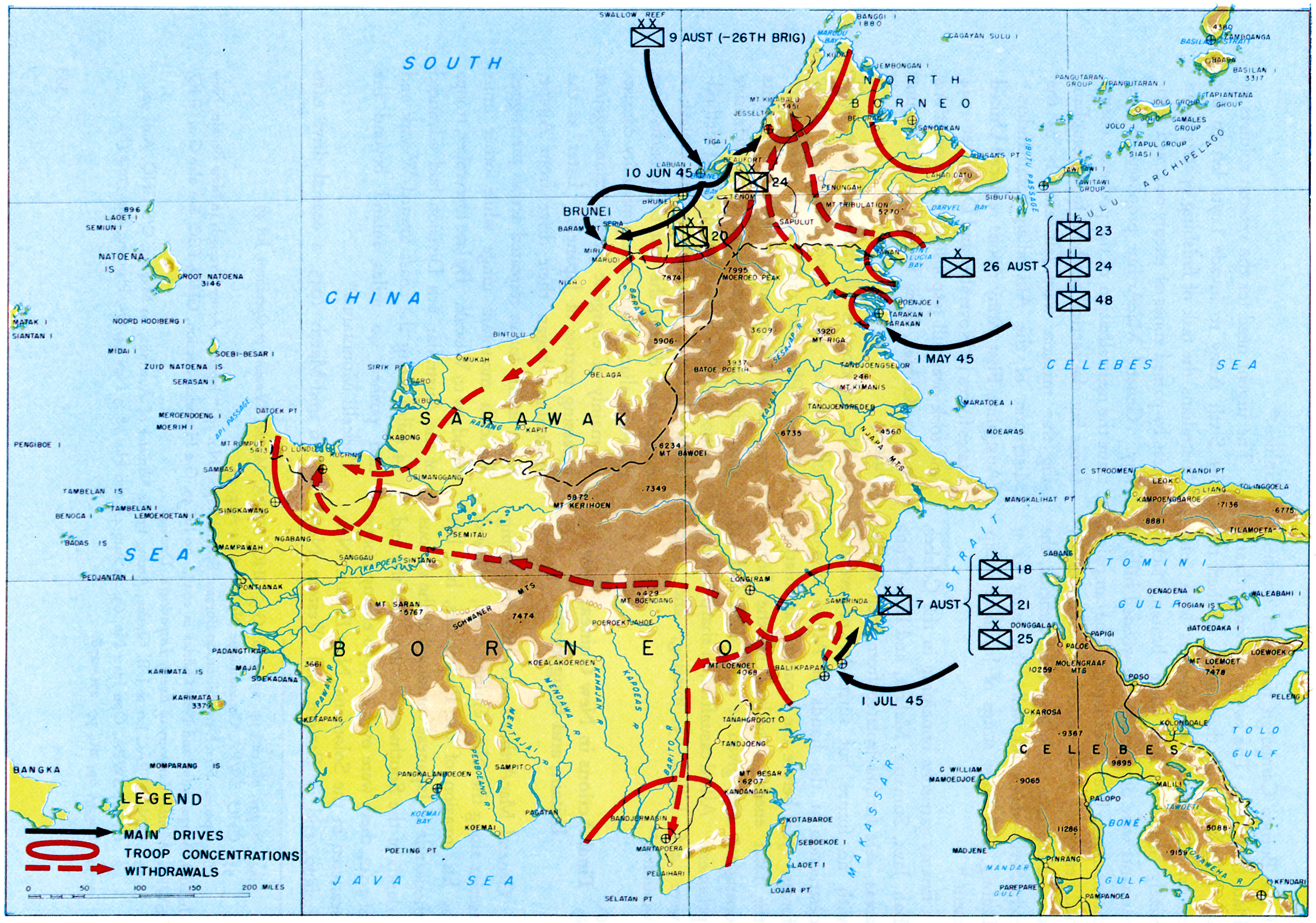
A map showing the progress of the Borneo campaign

The plans for the Allied attacks were known collectively as Operation Oboe. The invasion of Borneo was the second stage of Operation Montclair, which was aimed at destroying Imperial Japanese forces in, and re-occupying the NEI, Raj of Sarawak, Brunei, the colonies of Labuan and British North Borneo, and the southern Philippines. Borneo in particular was considered at the time a strategic location for its natural resource; oil and rubber. Tarakan was also seen to offer a forward airbase to support future operations in the region, while Brunei Bay was intended to be used as naval base. Planning for the operation began in late 1944 and early 1945 through the General Headquarters of General Douglas MacArthur's South West Pacific Area. As a result of the commitment of US forces to the recapture of the Philippines, the task of recapturing Borneo was allocated primarily to Australian ground forces. By this time the Australian I Corps, the Australian Army's main striking force, had not engaged in combat for over a year. The corps had been assigned to MacArthur, but he had chosen to not use it in the Philippines despite the Australian Government pressing for this.

The initial Allied plan comprised six stages: Operation Oboe 1 was to be an attack on Tarakan; Oboe 2 against Balikpapan; Oboe 3 against Banjarmasin; Oboe 4 against Surabaya or the capital of the NEI, Batavia (modern-day Jakarta); Oboe 5 against the eastern NEI; and Oboe 6 against British North Borneo (Sabah). In the end only the operations against Tarakan, Balikpapan and British North Borneo – at Labuan and Brunei Bay – took place. These operations ultimately constituted the last campaigns of Australian forces in the war against Japan. In the planning phase the commander of the Australian Military Forces, General Thomas Blamey recommended against the landing at Balikpapan, believing that it would serve no strategic purpose. After much consideration, the Australian Government agreed to provide forces for this operation at MacArthur's urging. Blamey was able to frustrate MacArthur's plans for Australian troops to make follow-on landings in Java by convincing Prime Minister John Curtin to withhold the 6th Division. Prior to the main landings in British North Borneo the Allies undertook a series of reconnaissance operations, codenamed Agas (northern Borneo) and Semut (Sarawak); these operations also worked to arm, train and organise the local population to undertake guerrilla warfare against the Japanese to support conventional operations.

The Japanese military began to prepare for the defence of Borneo from mid-1944, as Allied forces rapidly advanced towards the island. IJA reinforcements were allocated to Borneo, but did not arrive until between September and November that year. In late 1944 the Japanese command judged that Australian forces were likely to attack the Brunei area and then capture the west coast of Borneo as part of a campaign aimed at liberating Singapore. Accordingly, most of the IJA units in north-eastern Borneo were ordered to move overland to the west coast; this required them to undertake gruelling marches over rugged terrain. Two other battalions were transferred from north-eastern Borneo by sea to south Borneo between February and March 1945. After United States forces liberated key areas of the Philippines, which cut the rest of South-East Asia off from Japan, on 27 January 1945 the IJA's General Staff ordered the forces in this area to defend the territory they held and not expect reinforcements.

== Opposing forces ==
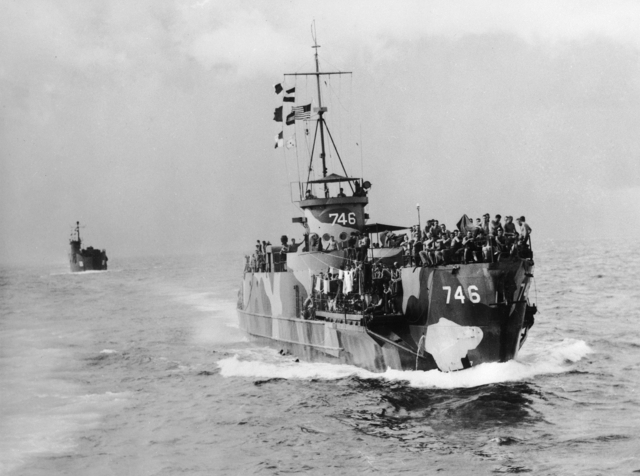
US Navy Landing Craft Infantry crowded with Australian soldiers prior to the landing at Labuan

The main Allied ground forces assigned to the campaign came from the Australian I Corps, under Lieutenant-General Leslie Morshead. The main elements of this force consisted of two infantry divisions: the 7th and 9th. For the operation, the Australian corps was assigned as a task force directly under MacArthur's command rather than as part of the Eighth Army, which was controlling operations in the Philippines. Allied naval and air forces, centred on the U.S. 7th Fleet under Admiral Thomas Kinkaid, the Australian First Tactical Air Force, and the U.S. Thirteenth Air Force also played important roles in the campaign. A small number of Dutch personnel also took part in the operations. Over 74,000 Allied troops were assigned to the initial landings of the campaign. The bulk of the logistic support was provided by the US, particularly provision of the shipping that was required to transport the vast amounts of troops, stores and equipment required for the operation.

Allied forces were resisted by IJN and IJA forces in southern and eastern Borneo, under Vice-Admiral Michiaki Kamada, and in the north-west by the Thirty-Seventh Army, (Note: A Japanese 'army' of World War II was equivalent to an Allied corps, and usually commanded between two and four divisions.) led by Lieutenant-General Masao Baba, which was headquartered in Jesselton. The main elements of the Thirty-Seventh Army were the 56th Independent Mixed Brigade (northern Borneo), 71st Independent Mixed Brigade (southern Borneo) and 25th Independent Mixed Regiment; these units had been raised in Japan during the second half of 1944 and arrived in Borneo late that year. The IJN's 2nd Naval Guard Force was also stationed in Borneo. Allied intelligence assessed that there were about 32,000 Japanese troops in Borneo, with 15,000 of these being combat troops. Most of the units which had been ordered from north-eastern Borneo to the west coast were still in transit when the Australian landings began and had been greatly weakened by the difficult conditions experienced during their cross-island march. The transfers left only single battalions and Balikpapan. Japanese air power in the region, except in Java and Sumatra, was ineffective.

== Battles ==
=== Tarakan ===
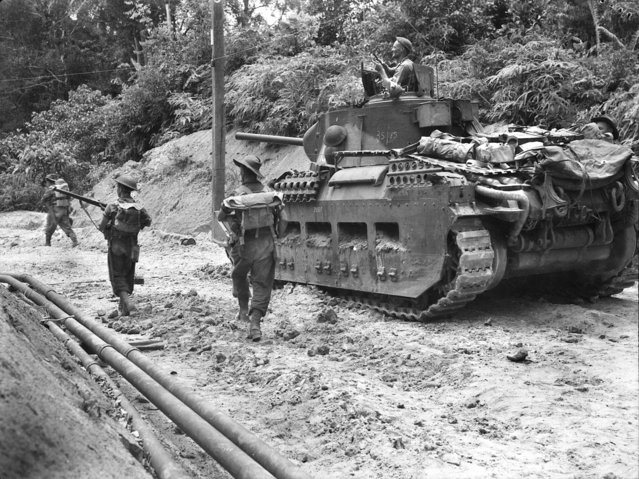
Australian infantrymen passing a Matilda tank in the interior of Tarakan

The campaign opened with Oboe 1, which consisted of a landing on the small island of Tarakan, off the north-east coast on 1 May 1945. This operation was undertaken to capture the island's airstrip so that it could be used to support the subsequent landings on the mainland of Borneo. Using Australian-built MK III folboats, small parties of reconnaissance troops paddled into the Tarakan region to obtain useful information and observe the Djoeta oilfields prior to an invasion.

The landing on Tarakan was assigned to the heavily reinforced 26th Brigade, under the command of Brigadier David Whitehead. This brigade's three infantry battalions were augmented with two battalions of pioneers as well as commandos and engineers. American amphibious engineers, an American amphibian tractor battalion (727th Amphibian Tractor Battalion), and a Dutch infantry company (made up of soldiers from Ambon Island) and civil affairs unit were also placed under Whitehead's command. Overall, the 26th Brigade had a strength of just under 12,000 troops. The Australian assault was preceded by a heavy aerial bombardment commencing 12 April, and undertaken by RAAF and US aircraft operating from Morotai Island and the Philippines; these aircraft interdicted Japanese shipping, attacked airfields, reduced obstacles around the landing beaches and suppressed artillery and defensive positions; in addition, a preliminary landing was undertaken on Sadau Island by a group of commandos and an artillery battery. Naval assets assigned to provide fire support during the operation include three cruisers, seven destroyers and several landing craft fitted with rockets and mortars. Three days prior to the assault, a force of minesweepers worked to clear the area of naval mines.

During the main landing, the battery on Sadau Island provided fire support to the Australian engineers who were landed at Lingkas to clear obstacles on the landing beaches. Assault troops from the 2/23rd and 2/48th Infantry Battalions came ashore under the cover of a strong naval barrage. Initially, they encountered no opposition before they began to advance north towards Tarakan town. Opposition around Lingkas Hill was overcome and by the end of the first day a strong beachhead had been established. The brigade reserve, the 2/24th Infantry Battalion, was landed the next day as the advance towards the airfield continued. Japanese resistance grew, and the advance was hindered by large numbers of mines and booby traps, which had to be cleared by engineers and pioneers; however, finally, on 5 May the airfield was captured by the Australians. Meanwhile, operations continued into June as isolated pockets of Japanese resisted the Australians in tunnels and on high features across the island. The final major objective, Hill 90, was secured on 20 June, but small scale clashes continued after this. Ultimately, the airfield was so heavily damaged that it took eight weeks to repair, by which time the war was essentially over. As a result, most historians, including the Australian official historian Gavin Long, believe that the invasion of Tarakan did not justify the casualties suffered by the Allied forces; these included 225 Australians killed and 669 wounded. Japanese casualties were even heavier, with 1,540 being killed and 252 captured.

=== North Borneo ===
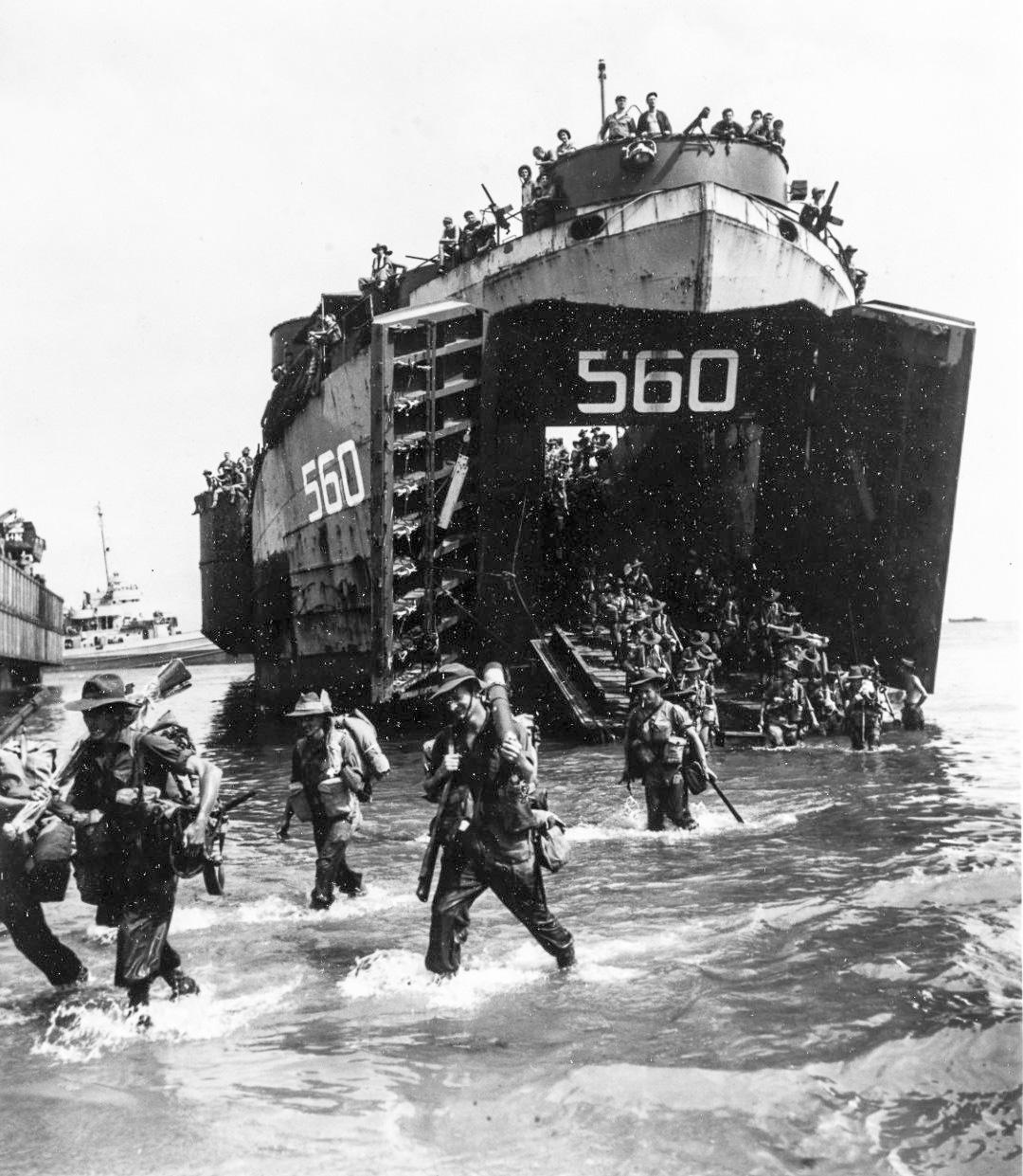
Australian soldiers disembarking from a US Navy LST at Labuan on 10 June 1945

The landings in north-west Borneo had several goals. These included securing the Brunei Bay area for use as a naval base and capturing oil and rubber facilities. A total of 29,000 personnel were assigned to the operation, just over 1,000 of these were US and British personnel, while the rest were Australian. Almost 6,000 were air force personnel, while 18,000 were ground troops and 4,700 were base area personnel. Major General George Wootten's 9th Division was the main element of this force, and consisted of two infantry brigades – the 20th and 24th; the division's third brigade – the 26th Brigade – had been detached for operations on Tarakan. The troops were supported by large number of American and Australian warships and air units. In preparation for the landing, a reconnaissance party including Sergeant Jack Wong Sue, was inserted into Kimanis Bay, British North Borneo, for close reconnaissance work using a Hoehn military folboat deployed from a Catalina aircraft.

Oboe 6 began on 10 June with simultaneous assaults by the 24th Brigade on the island of Labuan and the 20th Brigade on the coast of Brunei in the north-west of Borneo, bought from ships to shore by the 727th Amphibian Tractor Battalion. As Japanese forces were holding positions away from the coast, these landings were unopposed. The 20th Brigade encountered little resistance. After the town of Brunei was secured on 13 June, the brigade continued its advance along the coast towards the south-west. Its objective was the Miri–Lutong area, with the 2/17th Battalion moving by land while the 2/13th Battalion made an amphibious landing at Lutong on 20 June in LVT-4s of the American 727th Amph Trac Bn. The Japanese forces withdrew as the Australians advanced, and there was little fighting during these operations. Patrols into the interior made by the 20th Brigade with the assistance of local Dayaks into the interior were involved in several sharp engagements.

While the 24th Brigade rapidly captured Labuan's airfield and town, it encountered sustained resistance from the Japanese garrison which was located in a well-defended stronghold. After heavy casualties were sustained during the 2/28th Battalion's initial attack against this position on 16 June it was decided to subject the area to a sustained bombardment. The battalion attacked again on 21 June with the support of tanks and rapidly defeated the Japanese forces. The fighting on Labuan cost the 24th Brigade 34 killed and 93 wounded. The Australian soldiers counted 389 Japanese dead and took 11 prisoners.

A week after the initial landing on Labuan, the Australians followed up with attacks on Japanese positions around Weston on the north-eastern part of Brunei Bay. The Australians then pushed inland along the single track railway that ran from Weston towards the junction at Beaufort, 23 kilometres (14 mi) north-east of Brunei Bay, and then on to Jesselton. The heaviest fighting of the operations on the mainland took place on 27/28 June during the Battle of Beaufort, during which more than 100 Japanese defenders were killed. After this engagement the 24th Brigade undertook limited further advances in order to push the Japanese forces into the hills; the brigade's limit of exploitation was the Beaufort–Tenom railway and during this period the Australian commanders adopted a cautious approach to limit casualties. Nevertheless, clashes continued into August; on 3 August, the Japanese attempted to counterattack a position held by the 2/28th Battalion. At least 11 Japanese were killed in the fighting, for the loss of one Australian.

The operations in North Borneo also involved a substantial civil affairs effort to assist the liberated civilian population; this was the largest such task undertaken by Australian forces during World War II. The 9th Division was heavily involved in providing aid to civilians and rebuilding houses and infrastructure which had been destroyed by the pre-invasion bombardments and subsequent fighting.

=== Guerrilla warfare ===
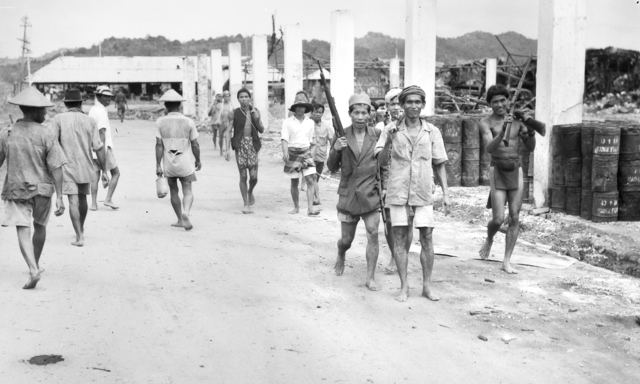
Dayak men armed with Japanese rifles in Brunei during June 1945 before returning to their villages in the interior.

The conventional operations on British North Borneo were accompanied by a guerrilla warfare campaign organised by Special Operations Australia (SOA). This involved two operations; Operation Agas in British North Borneo and Operation Semut in Sarawak. These operations succeeded the unsuccessful Operation Python which had been undertaken between October 1943 and January 1944.

Five SOA parties were inserted in North Borneo between March and July 1945. The Agas 1 and 2 parties established networks of agents and guerrillas in north-western Borneo. The Agas 4 and 5 parties were landed on the east coast of Borneo, and achieved little. The Agas 3 party investigated the Ranau area on the request of I Corps. The results of Operation Agas were mixed; its parties established control over their areas of operation, provided intelligence of variable quality and killed less than 100 Japanese.

As part of Operation Semut over 100 Allied personnel organised into four parties were inserted by air into Sarawak from March 1945. Most of these personnel were Australian. The Semut parties were tasked with collecting intelligence and establishing guerrilla forces. The inhabitants of Sarawak's interior, who were known as Dayaks, enthusiastically joined the guerrilla groups and SOA personnel led small private armies. No. 200 Flight RAAF and the Royal Australian Navy's Snake-class junks played important roles in this campaign by inserting SOA personnel and supplies.

The guerilla forces launched attacks to gain control of the interior of Sarawak while the 9th Division focused on the coastal area, the oilfields, plantations and the ports in North Borneo. The guerillas operated from patrol bases around Balai, Ridan and Marudi, as well as in the mountains, along several key waterways including the Pandaruan and Limbang Rivers, and along the railway that ran between Beaufort and Tenom. They sought to disrupt the Japanese troops' freedom of movement and interdicted forces as they withdrew from the main combat zone. The RAAF flew air strikes to support the lightly armed guerillas, who at times had to evade better-armed Japanese units. The campaign was highly successful, and it is estimated that over 1,800 Japanese were killed in north Borneo through guerilla actions.

=== Balikpapan ===
The attention of the Allies then switched back to the central east coast, with Oboe 2. The last major amphibious assault of World War II was at Balikpapan on 1 July 1945. The landing was preceded by a heavy aerial bombardment over the course of 20 days, while minesweepers worked to clear the area for 15 days, establishing safe lanes for the invasion fleet to pass and clearing proposed anchorages. These operations were undertaken inside the range of Japanese coastal guns; to protect the minesweepers, naval gunfire and aerial bombardment was used to suppress and neutralise the Japanese guns. Due to the unavailability of the Tarakan airfield, air support for the operation was provided by RAAF and US units based in the southern Philippines. Three minesweepers were lost during the clearance operations.

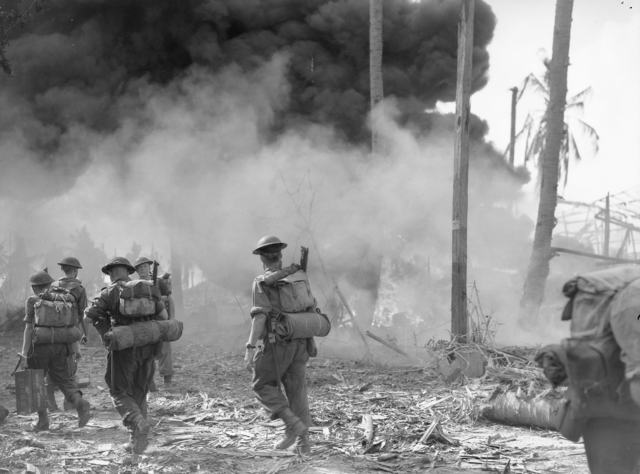
Members of the 7th Division at Balikpapan

The invasion fleet sailed from Morotai Island on 26 June, arriving off Balikpapan on 29 June. The landing area was then subjected to over 45,000 rounds of preparatory fire from the Australian, US and Dutch warships supporting the landing. A deception plan was enacted to draw Japanese attention towards Manggar, with the Australians undertaking pre-landing operations and spreading disinformation. US underwater demolition teams cleared obstacles along the landing beach, as well as off Manggar, as part of the deception plan. For the landing operation, a total of 33,000 personnel were assigned, 21,000 of which were from the Australian 7th Division, under the command of Major General Edward Milford. This formation consisted of three brigades – the 18th, 21st and 25th – fighting together as a formation for the first time during the war. Three beaches were chosen for the landing on the southern coast between Klandasan in the east and Stalkoedo in the west; the initial assault was undertaken by three infantry battalions: the 2/10th on the extreme left, the 2/12th in the centre and the 2/27th Battalion on the right. The troops were landed at the wrong location as smoke from the pre-landing bombardment made navigation difficult, but the landing was unopposed and a beachhead was quickly established as follow on forces arrived.

Operating on the left, the 18th Brigade fought to capture several high features around Klandasan and to gain control of the town and secure the harbour and port facilities in Balikpapan north-west of the landing beaches, while the 21st Brigade landed on the right, tasked with advancing east towards several Japanese airfields at Sepinggang and Manggar, along the main coastal road. The 25th Brigade was held in reserve, but after landing on 2 July, pushed inland towards Batuchampar, 10 miles (16 km) from the initial landing site. Balikpapan town and the port were captured on 3 July, but mopping up continued into 4 July. Along the coast, the 21st Brigade crossed the Batakan Ketjil River, where it was held up on 3 July by strong Japanese resistance, which was overcome with naval gunfire support. The following day, after crossing the Manggar Besar, the brigade came up against even stronger Japanese opposition, supported by coastal artillery and mortars defending the airfield; despite landing tanks around the river, the Australians were held up for several more days until some of the guns were captured, and heavy air strikes overwhelmed the defenders.

On 5 July, one of the 18th Brigade's infantry battalions – the 2/9th – along with the 2/1st Pioneer Battalion, was landed at Panadjam to clear the western shore of Japanese artillery, prior to the Allies opening the port. Against only limited opposition, the area around Panadjam was cleared within two days. Meanwhile, the airfields were secured by 9 July, but Japanese resistance was strong, utilising delaying tactics including booby traps, mines, sniping and small-scale raids. Strong resistance was met around Batuchampar where a Japanese battalion had established a stronghold, while others fought resolutely in tunnels around Mangar. Australian engineers were heavily tasked, working to clear over 8,000 mines and booby traps, as well as destroying over 100 tunnels.

Once Mangar airfield was secured, the 21st Brigade continued their advance towards Sambodja. Moving inland along a north-east road dubbed the "Milford Highway" by the Australians, the 25th Brigade advanced to contact with the Japanese rearguard, which was reduced with artillery support and then outflanked, triggering a withdrawal to a secondary position 3 miles (4.8 km) back on 9 July. Air strikes and artillery helped reduce this position, while infantry worked to surround the position; this was not fully achieved and by the evening of 21/22 July, the remaining defenders withdrew further inland. Opposition in these areas was largely overcome by the end of July, but mopping-up operations around Balikpapan continued until the end of the war in August as Japanese troops withdrew to the rough high ground further inland. Operations to secure Balikpapan cost the Australians 229 killed and 634 wounded, while Japanese losses were placed at 2,032 killed. A further 63 were captured.

== Aftermath ==
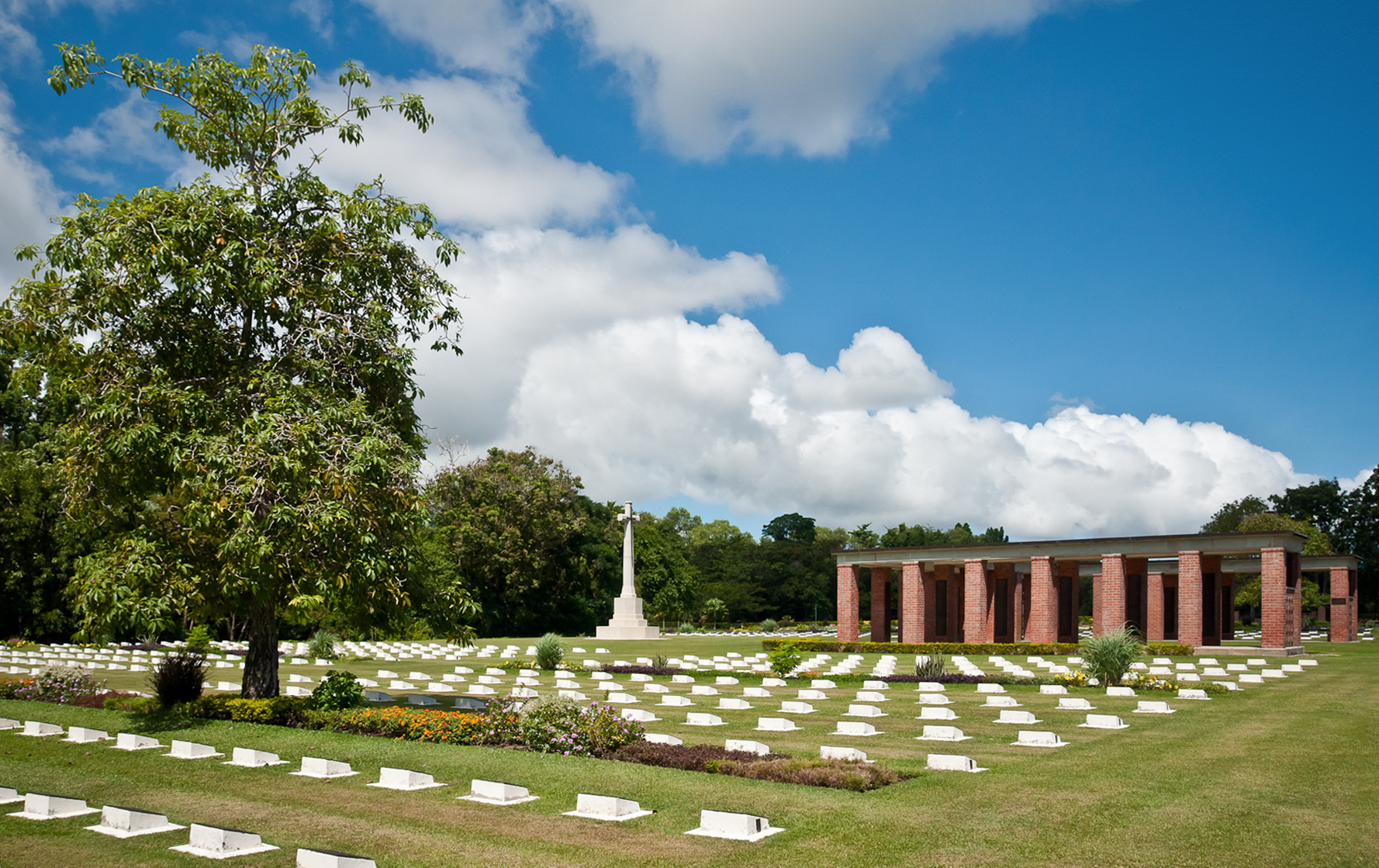
Part of the Labuan War Cemetery in 2011

In the aftermath of the campaign, Australian personnel remained in Borneo until late 1945 to restore civilian administration, oversee reconstruction efforts, supervising the surrender of Japanese troops, and liberating former Allied prisoners of war held in camps around Borneo. It has been claimed that Australian forces near Beaufort encouraged local fighters to massacre surrendered Japanese troops after the war in revenge for the Sandakan Death Marches, with almost 6,000 Japanese being killed. The historian Ooi Keat Gin states though that no documentary evidence supports these claims.

The amphibious operations undertaken by Australian forces throughout the Borneo campaign were, according to the historian Eustace Keogh the "outstanding feature" of the campaign, and represented the largest such operations that the Australians undertook during the war. They required vast amounts of naval and air support, as well as complex planning and co-operation between air, land and naval forces from several nations. A significant amount of time and resources were invested prior to the operation to train the forces assigned. The historian Peter Dennis assesses that the operations were of "doubtful value strategically...[but]...they were skillfully conducted". Casualties during the campaign on the Allied side amounted to about 2,100, while the Japanese suffered about 4,700 casualties. A considerable number of civilians were killed or wounded; for instance, the pre-invasion bombardment of Tarakan resulted in least 100 civilian casualties.

Despite the success of the Allied landings, because of the strategic situation, the Borneo campaign was criticised in Australia at the time and in subsequent years, as pointless or a "waste" of the lives of soldiers, especially following the first operation in Tarakan. In assessing the necessity of the campaign, historians such as Max Hastings have said that attacking these forces, already cut off from Japan, was a waste of resources. According to Hastings, "Any rational strategic judgment would have left them to their own devices screened by token allied forces until their nation's defeat enforced their surrender". It has been argued that the campaign did, however, achieve a number of objectives, such as increasing the isolation of significant Japanese forces occupying the main part of the NEI, capturing major oil supplies, and freeing Allied prisoners of war, who were being held in increasingly worse conditions in the Sandakan camp and Batu Lintang camp.
