= F. G. L. Chester =

Australian Army officer

Gort Chester
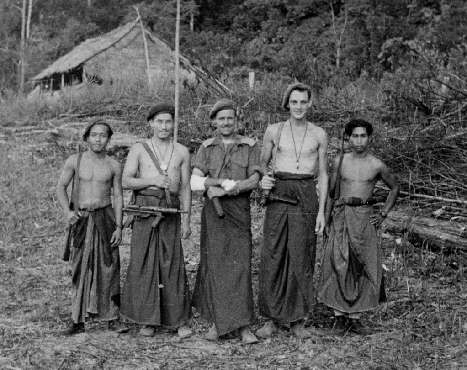
- Chester (centre) with AGAS 1 Party
- Born: 14 June 1899
- Died: 18 August 1946 (aged 47)
- Burial place: Jesselton (now Kota Kinabalu) Anglican Cemetery, North Borneo
- Military career
- Allegiance: United Kingdom; Australia
- Branch: British Army; Australian Army
- Rank: Lieutenant-Colonel
- Service number: 255581
- Units: King Edward's Horse; General List; Z Special Unit
- Conflicts: First World War; Second World War
- Awards: Distinguished Service Order; Officer of the Order of the British Empire

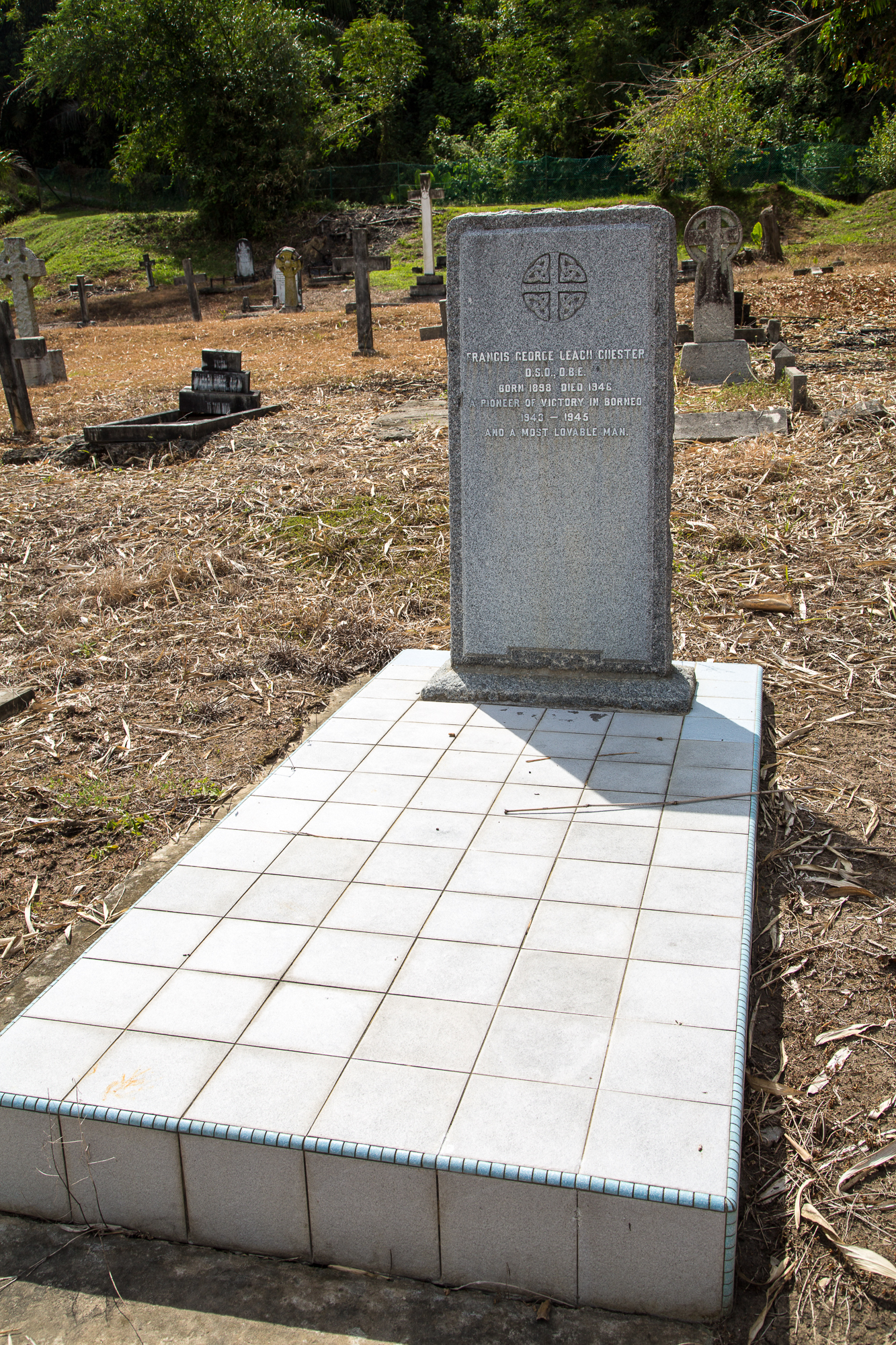
Tomb of Lieutenant-Colonel Chester in Kota Kinabalu

Lieutenant-Colonel Francis George Leach "Gort" Chester DSO, OBE (14 June 1899 – 18 August 1946) was a British soldier who led several Z Special Unit operations in Borneo during World War II.

== Life ==
Chester was born in Johannesburg, South Africa on 14 June 1899, the son of Arthur and Edith Florence Rose (née Murphy) Chester, both British. He was educated at Highfield School, Liphook, Hampshire, England, and then from May 1914-July 1916 at King's School, Canterbury, Kent. He graduated from the Royal Military College, Sandhurst, and during the First World War he served in King Edward's Horse, a cavalry regiment of the British Army, in 1917. He gained the nickname "Gort" due to his physical resemblance to the British Army Field Marshal John Vereker, 6th Viscount Gort.

Chester was a rubber planter at the Lokawee Estate near Jesselton in the West Coast area of North Borneo for twenty years before the Japanese invasion of January 1942. He was in Australia when the Far Eastern war broke out; he rejoined the British Army and was appointed second lieutenant on the General List on 1 May 1942, this commission was eventually backdated to 21 June 1941. At some point he was attached to the Australian Army's Services Reconnaissance Department (SRD) Z Special Unit.

Chester commanded the first Z Special Unit operation in Borneo during World War II: Operation Python I. This operation took place in early October 1943, and reported on Japanese sea-traffic in the Sibutu Passage and the Balabac Strait of the Sulu Sea, just to the north of North Borneo. The unit landed on Labian Point in North Borneo, opposite the Tawi-Tawi islands. Chester also provided support for a band of Filipino guerrillas under the command of an American officer, Captain J. A. Hamner. Chester was in touch with the East Coast of North Borneo: "He made many visits to his friends ashore there. He maintained communication with them by means of submarine and radio, and helped form guerrilla bands on the east coast. His visits were not always secret and he often moved rapidly from place to place with the Japanese and a pack of spies in close pursuit." He heard of the plans for an uprising against the Japanese and advised that it be postponed until the Allied forces were in a position to advance into Borneo; his advice was not heeded and the Double Tenth rebellion of the night of 9/10 October 1943 in North Borneo under the leadership of Albert Kwok resulted in the deaths of many Japanese. Thousands more local people died in the reprisals that followed.

Following this operation, Australian authorities recommended that he should be awarded the Distinguished Service Order (DSO), but after discussions between the Australian and British authorities, it was agreed that since there was no evidence that the unit had come under direct Japanese fire gallantry awards were inappropriate, so he would instead be appointed Officer of the Order of the British Empire. Similarly the awards recommended for the other members of the unit were amended from the Military Cross for Lieutenant Lloyd James Woods to appointment as Member of the Order of the British Empire (MBE) and Military Medals for Warrant Officer II Alexander Chew and Sergeant Frederick Gordon Olsen were amended to another MBE and the British Empire Medal respectively. The awards were eventually gazetted on 26 April 1945, dated 8 March 1945. Others connected with the mission were Mentioned in Despatches, all the awards were given minimal publicity as several of the recipients had relatives who were still interned by the Japanese or were prisoners of war.

Over a year later, in early March 1945, Chester (now holding temporary local rank as a lieutenant-colonel in the Australian Military Forces) commanded Agas I, which landed near Labuk Bay in North Borneo. He then went on to command Agas III which operated in the Jesselton-Keningau-Beaufort area of North Borneo. This operation incorporated Stallion IV, which aimed to obtain intelligence of enemy movements along the Jesselton-Beaufort part of the North Borneo Railway, the Ranau-Tambunan-Keningau Road, and the hinterland of Kimanis Bay. Chester was chosen for all these roles due to his intimate knowledge of the area of operation and his fluency in Malay. In addition, by the time of Agas III and Stallion IV, Chester had agents and known safe contacts in the region. Following these missions, he was again recommended for the DSO, this time successfully. The recommendation describes how, with three other officers and three NCOs, Chester was initially landed from a submarine on 3 March 1945, despite the Japanese land and sea patrols. On landing, they discovered a number of posters with a picture of Chester offering $15,000 reward for his capture—dead or alive—prompted by his earlier mission. This initial landing was between strongly held Japanese positions at Tegahang and Pura Pura, just 3 miles (4.8 km) apart. The natives in this area were hostile, so the party travelled 250 miles (400 km) by canoe before being able to head inland and start the main part of their mission to gather intelligence, raise a guerrilla force, and persuade the natives not to provide food and other supplies to the Japanese. On 25 May 1945, Chester was extracted by PBY Catalina flying boat, so he could brief II Corps staff, he was re-inserted, again by Catalina, along with some additional personnel, on 29 May, to obtain further information for 9th Division. Finally, the recommendation states that at the time of the eventual Japanese surrender, forces under Chester's command controlled two-thirds of British North Borneo. His DSO was gazetted on 6 March 1947, dated 2 November 1946. He was also awarded the American Medal of Freedom.

Colonel J. Finlay of the SRD headquarters in Melbourne wrote that Chester could "cut his way through close jungle quicker than almost any man alive", but that he had never known him walk more than 100 yards (91 m) in Melbourne without summoning a taxi.

At the end of the war Chester briefly went to Australia, and then returned to North Borneo, sailing on the Dominion Monarch on 18 October 1945. He resigned his commission on 30 March 1946 and was granted the honorary rank of lieutenant-colonel. He died of blackwater fever (a complication of malaria) at Jesselton (Kota Kinabalu) on 18 August 1946. His gravestone in Kota Kinabalu Anglican Cemetery bears the epitaph "A pioneer of victory in Borneo and a most lovable man." On 6 March 2007 Chester's grave was visited by Tan Sri Datuk Chong Kah Kiat, the former 13th Chief Minister of Sabah, and at the time Deputy Chief Minister of Sabah and Minister of Tourism, Environment and Development. The town of Tawau in the state of Sabah, Malaysia has a street named after him, initially rendered as Chester Street, and subsequently rerendered as Jalan Chester.

== See also ==
- Jack Wong Sue
