= HMAS River Snake =

Snake-class junk of Royal Australian Navy

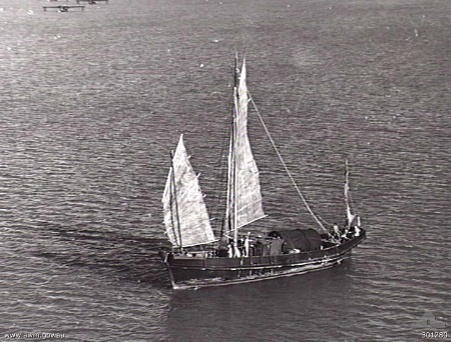
- HMAS River Snake in May 1945

History

Australia
- Name: HMAS River Snake
- Builder: Millars Bunnings Shipbuilding, Fremantle
- Launched: 1945
- In service: 19 February 1945
- Out of service: 2 November 1945
- Fate: Handed over to the British Civil Administration Unit in Borneo

General characteristics
- Class & type: Snake-class junk
- Tonnage: 80 tons (gross)
- Length: 66 ft (20 m)
- Beam: 17 ft (5.2 m)
- Depth: 7.6 ft (2.3 m)
- Installed power: Gray Marine 64 YTL diesel, single screw, 300 hp (220 kW)
- Speed: 9 knots (17 km/h)
- Range: 500 nautical miles (930 km)
- Capacity: 20 tons of cargo
- Complement: 9
- Armament: Two Oerlikon 20 mm cannon, three or four M2 Browning machine guns or Bren Guns

HMAS River Snake was a Snake-class junk built for the Royal Australian Navy during the Second World War. She was launched in 1945 and commissioned into the Royal Australian Navy on 19 February 1945. She was used by the Services Reconnaissance Department (SRD) and was paid off on 2 November 1945, before being handed over to the British Civil Administration in Borneo.

== Operation Suncharlie ==
During Operation Suncharlie SRD operatives were deployed from HMAS River Snake, an Australian built Country Craft, in Portuguese Timor on 23 April 1945. This operation, partly using folboats (collapsible kayaks), was to be for long term intelligence work, but after a short reconnaissance they returned to River Snake on 26 April 1945.

Commander John Gowing.

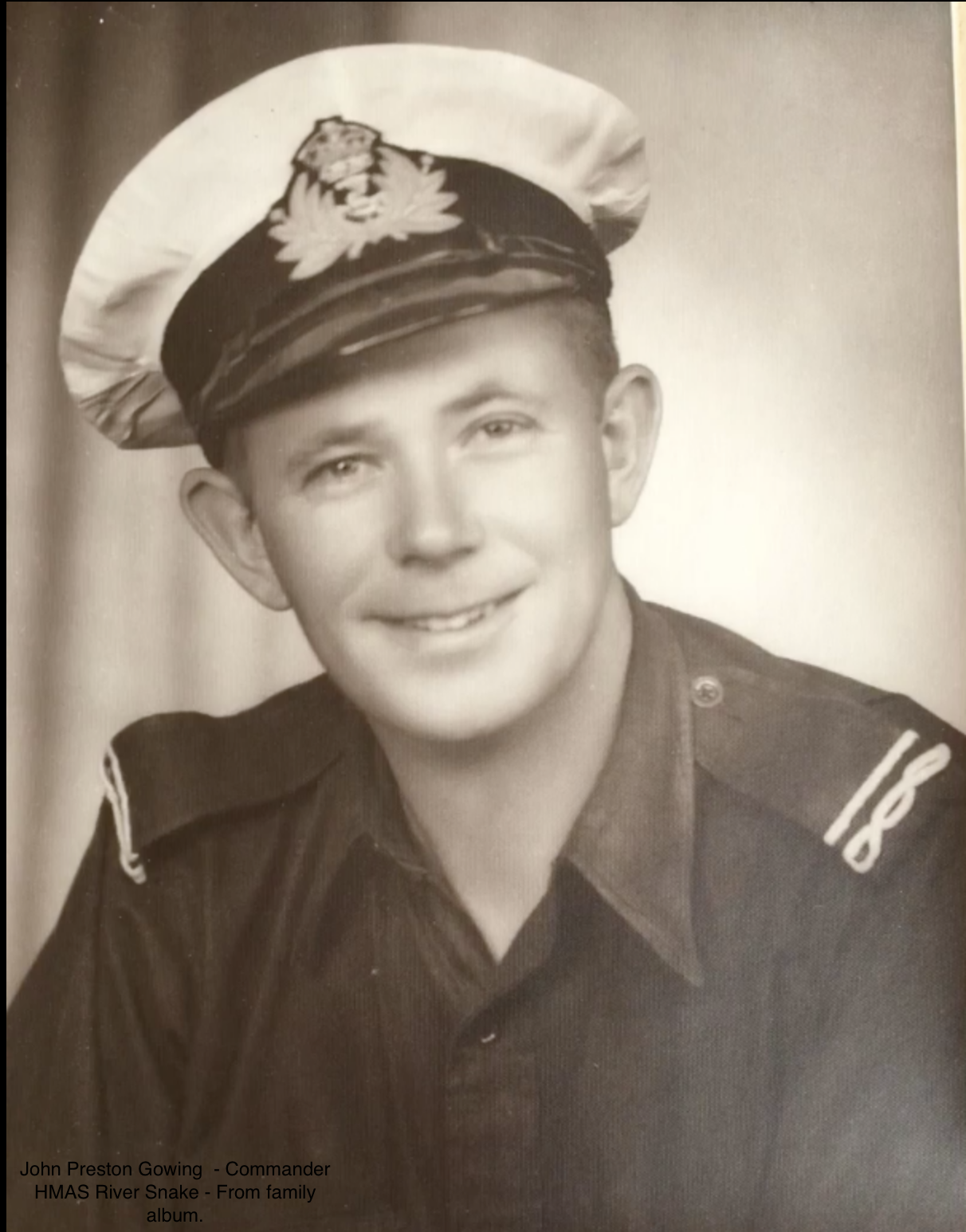
