= HMAS Black Snake =

Snake-class junk of Royal Australian Navy

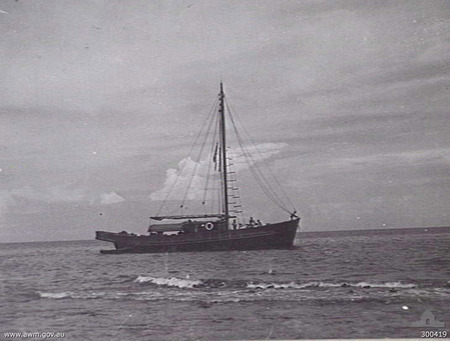

History

Australia
- Name: HMAS Black Snake
- Builder: J.J. Savage and Sons, Williamstown
- Launched: 1944
- In service: 30 December 1944
- Out of service: 3 November 1945

General characteristics
- Class & type: Snake-class junk
- Tonnage: 80 tons (gross)
- Length: 66 ft (20 m)
- Beam: 17 ft (5.2 m)
- Depth: 7.6 ft (2.3 m)
- Installed power: Gray Marine 64 YTL diesel, single screw, 300 hp (220 kW)
- Speed: 9 knots (17 km/h)
- Range: 500 nautical miles (930 km)
- Capacity: 20 tons of cargo
- Complement: 9
- Armament: Two Oerlikon 20 mm cannon, three or four M2 Browning machine guns or Bren Guns

HMAS Black Snake was a Snake-class junk built for the Royal Australian Navy during the Second World War. She was launched in 1944 and commissioned into the Royal Australian Navy on 30 December 1944. She was used by the Services Reconnaissance Department (SRD) and was paid off on 3 November 1945, before being handed over to the British Civil Administration in Borneo.

On 26 April 1945 Black Snake, commanded by Sub-Lieutenant John Key, deployed a party of nine SRD operatives, called Giraffe 3, in the Celebes area. They anchored off the west coast of Maloe Island. Using Hoehn military folboats (collapsible kayak) a party of four, including Key, landed at Pasirpoeth to repair native boats. Some then sailed on to nearby Tifore Island to give assistance and medical attention to natives there. On 30 April 1945, Black Snake returned to Morotai.

On 16 May 1945, a party of SRD operatives, codenamed Swift, went to Loloda Island in the Celebes via Blacksnake and used a folboat to go ashore and gather general intelligence.
