= Operation Montclair =

Operation Montclair was a military operation during the Second World War. The final version of the outline plan originally called Operation Princeton, it outlined plans to recapture the Visayas and Mindanao in the Philippines, Borneo and the Dutch East Indies.

The operation was planned by the South-West pacific Area command under General Douglas MacArthur, and was a joint US and Australian effort. The US 8th Army under Lieutenant General Robert L. Eichelberger was allocated the Visayas part of the operation, and the I Australian Corps under Lieutenant General Sir Leslie Morshead was allocated the Borneo part.

US plans originally called for the elimination of the Japanese garrisons in the unliberated parts of the Philippines to be performed by Filipino guerillas and the reformed Filipino army. Nonetheless, on February 6, 1944, General MacArthur ordered General Eichelberger to mop up the Japanese forces in the Philippines with his 8th Army, supported by Vice Admiral Thomas C. Kinkaid's 7th Fleet. This culminated in a series of operations called Operation Victor I through V:

- Battle of the Visayas (Victor I, II, II)
- Battle of Mindanao (Victor IV, V)

At the same time, I Australian Corps was ordered to take Borneo to supply the US forces for the planned invasion of Japan with oil. Once Borneo had been liberated, I Australian Corps was to form part of the invasion of Java. For more details, see Borneo campaign (1945).
