= Snake-class junk =

Class of vessel operated by Royal Australian Navy

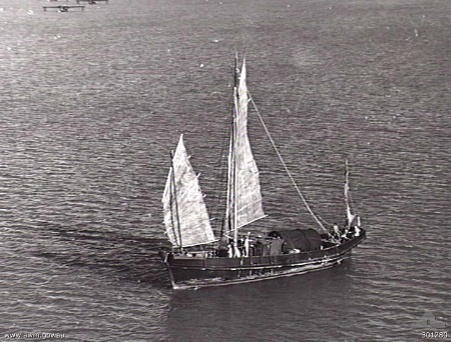
- HMAS River Snake in May 1945

Class overview
- Name: Snake class
- Builders: J.J. Savage and Sons, Williamstown (four boats); Millars Bunnings Shipbuilding, Fremantle (two boats)
- Operators: Royal Australian Navy, Australian Army
- Built: 1944–1945
- In service: 1944–1945
- Planned: 7
- Completed: 6
- Canceled: 1
- Active: 0

General characteristics
- Type: Junk
- Displacement: 80 tons (gross)
- Length: 66 ft (20 m)
- Beam: 17 ft (5.2 m)
- Draught: 7.6 ft (2.3 m)
- Propulsion: Gray Marine 64 YTL diesel, single screw, 300 horsepower (220 kW)
- Speed: 9 knots (17 km/h; 10 mph)
- Range: 500 nautical miles (930 km; 580 mi)
- Capacity: 20 tons of cargo
- Crew: 9
- Armament: Two Oerlikon 20 mm cannon; three or four M2 Browning machine guns or Bren Guns
- Notes: Ships' characteristics from Corvettes. Australia's Naval Patrol Forces. Photofile No. 10, p. 48

The Snake-class junks were a class of six small vessels operated by the Royal Australian Navy (RAN) to support special forces operations in 1944 and 1945 (a seventh vessel was not completed before the end of the war). The ships were lightly armed and were used to infiltrate special forces parties and their supplies into Japanese-held territory.

== Service history ==
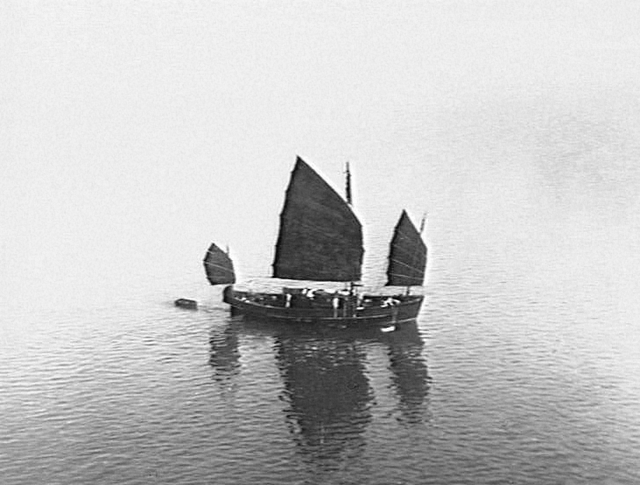
HMAS Tiger Snake in April 1945

When the Services Reconnaissance Department's (SRD) naval section was established in January 1944 it was equipped with only two vessels to transport special forces parties and their supplies behind Japanese lines. In order to make up this deficiency four trawler-type ships which were being built at Williamstown, Victoria for the Australian Army were transferred to SRD on 26 March 1944. The superstructure of these vessels was modified so that they appeared similar to the junks operated in the Singapore area. A further two vessels were later built at Fremantle, Western Australia and a fifth Williamstown-built ship was cancelled at the end of the war. While all six ships were commissioned into the RAN, their nine-man crews were drawn from the Navy and other services.

The Snake-class vessels relied on stealth to penetrate into Japanese territory. They were lightly armed with two Oerlikon 20 mm cannons and three or four M2 Browning machine guns or Bren Guns for defensive purposes only. They could also carry up to 20 tons of cargo stored below decks.

The Snake-class vessels commenced operations in late 1944 and operated from bases at Darwin, Morotai, New Guinea, the Philippines and Borneo. Four of the class (Tiger Snake, Black Snake, Sea Snake and River Snake) undertook operations in Japanese territory, and these ships completed only eleven missions before the end of the war.

Some Snake-class junks were also used to deploy ‘Z’ unit commando operatives with folboats; namely, HMAS River Snake landed a group with the aid of folboats in Portuguese Timor on 23 April 1945 for long-term intelligence during Operation Suncharlie.

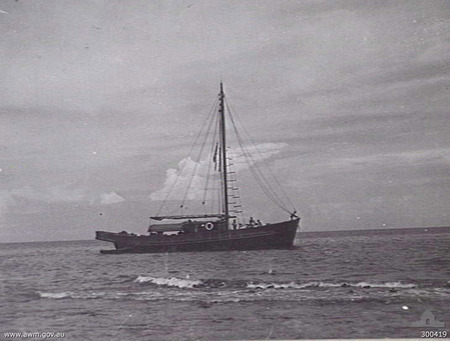
HMAS Black Snake in 1945

On 26 April 1945 a party of nine were deployed from HMAS Black Snake off the west coast of Maloe Island using folboats. The party included Sub-Lieut. John Key, commander of Black Snake. They landed at Pasirpoeth to repair some native boats who were helping the Allied forces. Some then continued on to nearby Tifore Island to give assistance and medical attention to natives. On 30 April 1945, Black Snake returned to Morotai.

On 16 May 1945 during Operation Swift, a folboat party from HMAS Black Snake went to Loloda Island in the Celebes to gather general intelligence.

On 13–23 August 1945, HMAS Tiger Snake moored at Mukah out of Labuan, Sarawak as part of Operation Semut. The party leader Lieutenant Rowan Waddy and Lieutenant Ron Hoey journeyed by folboat along the Mukah River to engage, with the help of local natives, any remaining hostile Japanese military groups. On the way they were threatened by a crocodile about the length of the folboat, but they managed to fight it off without using firearms, which would have given their position away.

All of the folboats deployed from these Snake-class junks and used in the relevant operations were the Australian built Hoehn type military folboat.

The Australian military did not require the Snake class after Japan's surrender, and all but Diamond Snake were transferred to the British Borneo Civil Administration Unit between November and December 1945. Diamond Snake was transferred to the Australian Army on 19 October that year.

== Ships in class ==
The seven Snake-class vessels were:

Ship	Builder	Commissioned	Decommissioned	Notes
HMAS Black Snake	J.J. Savage and Sons, Williamstown	30 December 1944	3 November 1945	Commanded by S/Lt. John Key
HMAS Coral Snake	J.J. Savage and Sons, Williamstown	Construction suspended in August 1945. Completed as a conventional ketch-rigged vessel, auctioned on the behalf of the RAN on 21 May 1947 and sold to Fish Canneries of Tasmania for £5200.		
HMAS Diamond Snake	J.J. Savage and Sons, Williamstown	23 July 1945	19 October 1945	Transferred to the Australian Army
HMAS Grass Snake	Millars Bunnings Shipbuilding, Fremantle	23 April 1945	13 December 1945	Commanded by S/LT John Preston Gowing at some point; date unclear; see service record below.
HMAS River Snake	Millars Bunnings Shipbuilding, Fremantle	19 February 1945	2 November 1945	Commanded by S/LT John Preston Gowing
HMAS Sea Snake	J.J. Savage and Sons, Williamstown	31 March 1945	27 November 1945	
HMAS Tiger Snake	J.J. Savage and Sons, Williamstown	22 August 1945	3 November 1945	
