= HMAS Diamond Snake =

History

Australia
- Name: HMAS Diamond Snake
- Builder: J.J. Savage and Sons, Williamstown
- Launched: 1945
- In service: 23 July 1945
- Out of service: 19 October 1945
- Fate: Transferred to Australian Army

General characteristics
- Class & type: Snake-class junk
- Tonnage: 80 tons (gross)
- Length: 66 ft (20 m)
- Beam: 17 ft (5.2 m)
- Depth: 7.6 ft (2.3 m)
- Installed power: Gray Marine 64 YTL diesel, single screw, 300 hp (220 kW)
- Speed: 9 knots (17 km/h)
- Range: 500 nautical miles (930 km)
- Capacity: 20 tons of cargo
- Complement: 9
- Armament: Two Oerlikon 20 mm cannon, three or four M2 Browning machine guns or Bren Guns

HMAS Diamond Snake was a Snake-class junk built for the Royal Australian Navy during the Second World War. She was launched in 1945 and commissioned into the Royal Australian Navy on 23 July 1945. She was used by the Services Reconnaissance Department and was paid off on 19 October 1945, before being transferred to the Australian Army.
