= HMAS Tiger Snake =

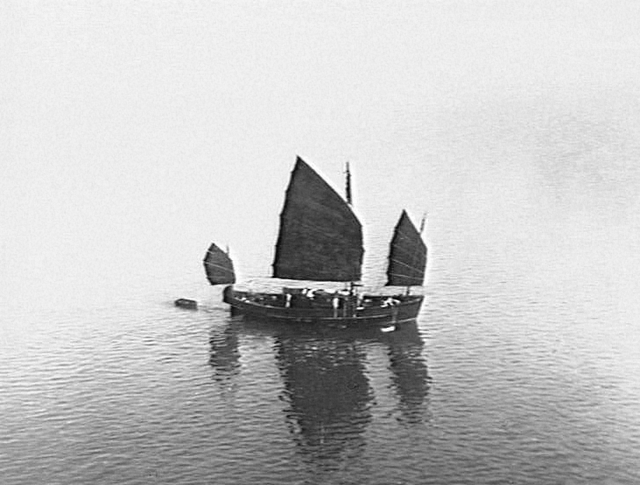
- HMAS Tiger Snake in April 1945

History

Australia
- Name: Tiger Snake
- Builder: J.J. Savage and Sons, Williamstown
- Launched: 1945
- In service: 22 August 1945
- Out of service: 3 November 1945

General characteristics
- Class & type: Snake-class junk
- Tonnage: 80 tons (gross)
- Length: 66 ft (20 m)
- Beam: 17 ft (5.2 m)
- Depth: 7.6 ft (2.3 m)
- Installed power: Gray Marine 64 YTL diesel, single screw, 300 hp (220 kW)
- Speed: 9 knots (17 km/h; 10 mph)
- Range: 500 nmi (930 km; 580 mi)
- Capacity: 20 tons of cargo
- Complement: 9
- Armament: Two Oerlikon 20 mm cannon, three or four M2 Browning machine guns or Bren Guns

HMAS Tiger Snake was a Snake-class junk built for the Royal Australian Navy during the Second World War. She was launched in 1945 and commissioned into the Royal Australian Navy on 22 August 1945 and was used by the Services Reconnaissance Department (SRD).

== Operations ==
On 14 July 1945, HMAS Tiger Snake transported D Company of the 2/17th Battalion on a patrol of the Baram River, Borneo. She was paid off on 3 November 1945, before being handed over to the British Civil Administration in Borneo.

Between 13 and 23 August 1945, HMAS Tiger Snake, carrying SRD operatives of Operation Semut IVB sailed out of Labuan, Sarawak, and moored near the mouth of the Mukah River. The operative leader, Lieutenant Rowan Waddy, and Lieutenant Ron Hoey, using a Hoehn military folboat (collapsible kayak) paddled along the Mukah to engage, with the help of local natives, any remaining hostile Japanese groups. On the way they were threatened by a crocodile the length of the folboat, but managed to deal with it. After their mission was accomplished they safely returned to Tiger Snake.
