= No. 200 Flight RAAF =

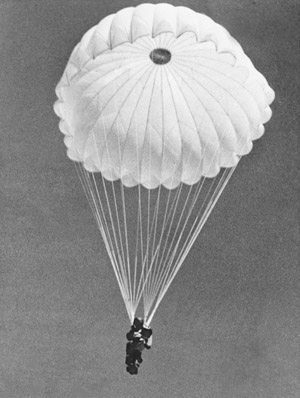
- Roland Griffiths-Marsh, a member of Z Special Unit conducting parachute training at Leyburn
- Active: February – December 1945
- Country: Australia
- Branch: Royal Australian Air Force
- Type: Special operations
- Engagements: World War II: Borneo Campaign

Insignia
- Squadron code: NX

Aircraft flown
- Transport: B-24 Liberator

No. 200 Flight was a Royal Australian Air Force special duties flight of World War II. The flight was formed in February 1945 to support the Allied Intelligence Bureau (AIB) and saw action over Borneo and the Netherlands East Indies (NEI) from March that year until the end of the war in August. No. 200 Flight was disbanded in December 1945.

== History ==
From late 1943 B-24 Liberators of the United States Army Air Forces (USAAF) 380th Bombardment Group were used on occasion to support Allied special operations units in the South West Pacific Area. In July two No. 24 Squadron RAAF B-24s were also modified to drop special operations personnel and conducted operations from Hollandia in this role during August.

In June 1944 it was proposed that a specialised RAAF unit be formed to provide air transport for the AIB's Z Special Unit. This proposal was supported, and No. 200 Flight was formed at Leyburn, Queensland on 20 February 1945. Many of the flight's air and ground crew were transferred to it from No. 99 Squadron. The flight was controlled by the AIB and was tasked with the insertion and supply of intelligence gathering parties behind Japanese lines. Due to the secrecy of these tasks personnel from the flight were forbidden to speak about their duties at any time. No. 200 Flight's six B-24 Liberators had been modified for the unit's specialised role. The main changes were the removal of the mid-upper and ball turrets and all armour plate, the replacement of the normal radar with a Rebecca radio set and the installation of a slide at the rear of the aircraft to drop personnel and supplies.

No. 200 Flight began training operations with Z Special Unit immediately upon formation. Despite the priority accorded to the unit, it experienced shortages of equipment and its accommodation and maintenance facilities at Leyburn were basic. By mid-March No. 200 Flight had a strength of nine eleven-man aircrews, 450 ground crew and six B-24s.

The flight began its first operations on 15 March 1945. On that day three B-24s (A72-191, A72-159 and A72-192) departed Leyburn for McGuire Field in Mindoro, where they arrived on 18 March, via Darwin and Morotai. After unsuccessful attempts on 21 and 22 March, two B-24s (A72-191 and A72-159) dropped a party of eight Z Special Unit personnel and equipment near Bario on 25 March but the aircraft (A72-191) flown by No. 200 Flight's commanding officer, Squadron Leader Harold Graham Pockley, disappeared on its way back to base with the loss of the 11 man crew and a British SOE officer, Major Henry. E. Ellis, who was attached to Z Special Unit. The two remaining Australian Liberators and United States Navy aircraft searched for this B-24 for two days, but did not locate its wreckage and returned to Leyburn on 30 March. No. 200 Flight continued to support Z Special Unit's operations (designated 'Semut 1') around Bario for the next few months, and eventually flew in 30 of the 42 personnel involved. Wing Commander E. V. Read succeeded Pockley on 15 April.

No. 200 Flight continued supporting AIB operations until the end of the war. On the night of 15/16 April three of its aircraft dropped personnel assigned to the Semut 2 operation in Borneo. It subsequently flew over 30 operations to drop AIB personnel and supplies in Borneo, Ambon, Lombok, Sumatra and Timor. These operations were successful, though the flight was hampered by the difficulty of locating its drop zones and inadequate support from the Australian First Tactical Air Force at Morotai, its main forward operational base. No. 200 Flight lost a further two B-24s in these operations; one was possibly shot down over Timor on 17 May and the other crashed either in or off the coast of north Borneo on or about 21 May. At least 46 men, including Z Special Unit operatives, were killed in the three aircraft which were lost, and this represented the highest loss rate of any of the RAAF's B-24 equipped units.

No. 200 Flight continued flying after the end of the war on 15 August 1945. It continued dropping AIB operatives and supplies until mid-October whereupon it was used to fly AIB personnel from Bougainville Island and Finschafen in New Guinea to Australia as well as to conduct courier flights. Mechanical problems were increasingly encountered in this period as a result of experienced personnel being discharged. No. 200 Flight's last sorties were made to drop leaflets and the unit was disbanded on 15 December 1945.

== See also ==
- B-24 Liberators in Australian service

== Bibliography ==
- Nelmes, Michael V. (1994). Tocumwal to Tarakan. Australians and the Consolidated B-24 Liberator. Belconnen: Banner Books. ISBN 1-875593-04-7.
- RAAF Historical Section (1995). Units of the Royal Australian Air Force. A Concise History. Volume 4 Maritime and Transport Units. Canberra: Australian Government Publishing Service. ISBN 0-644-42796-5.
