= HMAS Grass Snake =

Snake-class junk of Royal Australian Navy

History

Australia
- Name: HMAS Grass Snake
- Builder: Millars Bunnings Shipbuilding, Fremantle
- Launched: 1945
- In service: 23 April 1945
- Out of service: 13 December 1945
- Fate: Handed over to the British Civil Administration Unit in Borneo

General characteristics
- Class & type: Snake-class junk
- Tonnage: 80 tons (gross)
- Length: 66 ft (20 m)
- Beam: 17 ft (5.2 m)
- Depth: 7.6 ft (2.3 m)
- Installed power: Gray Marine 64 YTL diesel, single screw, 300 hp (220 kW)
- Speed: 9 knots (17 km/h)
- Range: 500 nautical miles (930 km)
- Capacity: 20 tons of cargo
- Complement: 9
- Armament: Two Oerlikon 20 mm cannon, three or four M2 Browning machine guns or Bren Guns

HMAS Grass Snake was a Snake-class junk built for the Royal Australian Navy during the Second World War. She was launched in 1945 and commissioned into the Royal Australian Navy on 23 April 1945. (Note: Monthly Report of C.O. Grass Snake to Naval Officer in Charge, Darwin for June 1945 has commissioning date of 22 April. (AWM78-124))

The vessel departed Broome, Western Australia on 4 June for Darwin, Northern Territory on a voyage plagued with mechanical and radio problems. In heavy weather the rudder was damaged requiring anchorage at Cockatoo Island (Western Australia) for repairs on 5 June. An attempt to sail the next day showed further repairs needed and a return to anchorage with radio failure making reports impossible. The ship got underway again on 7 June but had to anchor again in Brecknock Harbor for further repairs where it was established the radio had a burned out condenser and was not repairable. On 8 June the ship got underway, passing through Rogers Straits before anchoring and making further rudder checks before crossing Joseph Bonaparte Gulf for Darwin. Grass Snake passed through the Darwin boom early afternoon on 12 June where on 26 June extensive rudder damage was evaluated. There too note was made that the main engine with 330 hours since commissioning ran well but the auxiliary engine with 376 hours "gave considerable trouble" and the bilge pump had a stoppage in the intake so that neither power nor hand pumping was effective.

Grass Snake was part of a group of ships that entered Makassar on 21 September 1945 to land occupying troops and provide logistics support. On 28 November the ship departed Balikpapan for Labuan on a voyage on which radio problems led to an Inquiry into the commanding officer's "neglect to inform authorities of progress" that "caused some anxiety for the safety of the vessel and also caused unnecessary sea and air searches to be made." The result showed the commanding officer had consulted with the Port Director, Balikpapan on the route and the conclusion had been that the ship should make for Tawi-Tawi, where an American unit was expected to be still on the island, for a stop in case repairs to the main engine were necessary and that if the radio was giving problems the American unit could transmit. The radio did fail and the ship was delayed by a "heavy tide" that despite six hours at full speed prevented any progress. On arrival at Tawi-Tawi on 1 December there was no American unit or any authority that could forward signals. With several more stops and no radio the ship reported at Labuan on 9 December. During that time Naval Officer in Charge, Moluccas, ordered searches, both air and sea including a trace of the supposed route by HMAS Gascoyne (K354), and inquiry of Dutch officials (Note: One message notes "Dutch have no communication with small ports up the coast.") for any reports of Grass Snake had been fruitless.

Grass Snake was used by the Services Reconnaissance Department and was paid off on 13 December 1945, before being handed over to the British Civil Administration in Borneo.
