= HMAS Sea Snake =

Snake-class junk of Royal Australian Navy

History

Australia
- Name: Sea Snake
- Builder: J.J. Savage and Sons, Williamstown
- Launched: 1945
- In service: 31 March 1945
- Out of service: 27 November 1945

General characteristics
- Class & type: Snake-class junk
- Tonnage: 80 tons (gross)
- Length: 66 ft (20 m)
- Beam: 17 ft (5.2 m)
- Depth: 7.6 ft (2.3 m)
- Installed power: Gray Marine 64 YTL diesel, single screw, 300 hp (220 kW)
- Speed: 9 knots (17 km/h; 10 mph)
- Range: 500 nmi (930 km; 580 mi)
- Capacity: 20 tons of cargo
- Complement: 9
- Armament: Two Oerlikon 20 mm cannon, three or four M2 Browning machine guns or Bren Guns

HMAS Sea Snake was an auxiliary Snake-class junk built for the Royal Australian Navy during the Second World War. She was launched in 1945 and commissioned into the Royal Australian Navy on 31 March 1945. She was used by the Services Reconnaissance Department and was paid off on 27 November 1945, before being handed over to the British Civil Administration in Borneo.
