= Roland Griffiths-Marsh =

Australian soldier and author

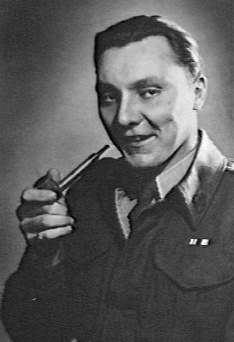
- Studio portrait of Roland Griffiths-Marsh in 1945.
- Born: 22 April 1923; Penang, Straits Settlements
- Died: 29 December 2012 (aged 89)
- Military career
- Allegiance: Australia
- Branch: Second Australian Imperial Force
- Service years: 1940–1945
- Rank: Corporal
- Service number: VX16310
- Units: 2/8th Battalion; Z Special Unit
- Conflicts: Second World War; North African Campaign; Battle of Greece; New Guinea campaign; Borneo campaign
- Awards: Military Medal
- Other work: Author

Roland Griffiths-Marsh, MM (22 April 1923 – 29 December 2012) was an Australian soldier and author.

== Early life ==
Griffiths-Marsh was born in Penang, then part of the British Straits Settlements, on 22 April 1923 and grew up in Hai Phong, Indochina. On 29 February 1940, at the age of sixteen, he enlisted with the Second Australian Imperial Force, taking his older brother's name and date of birth to ensure entry.

== Second World War ==
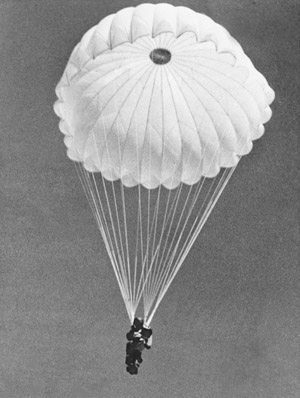
Griffiths-Marsh undergoing parachute training with Z Special Unit in 1945.

Griffiths-Marsh served in the 2/8th Battalion in North Africa and New Guinea, before being recruited to Z Special Unit, a specialist reconnaissance and sabotage unit that operated behind Japanese lines in South-East Asia. He served in the Semut I operation in North Borneo, and was parachuted behind enemy lines to conduct guerrilla warfare with the assistance of local fighters in early June 1945. He was awarded the Military Medal for his service with Z Special Unit, the award was gazetted on 6 March 1947, dated 2 November 1945. The original recommendation for the award states:

...he quickly formed a small guerilla [sic] force to harass the Japs escaping through the area. He showed a quick grasp of native mentality and a real ability to lead native troops... In this area he killed 34 Japanese and captured 4. In August he took charge of blocking the track from SAPONG estate west to MAHAMAN in conjunction with 9th Aust Div which he carried out with marked success, killing a further 4 Japs and capturing valuable intelligence reports and maps. During these experiences, Griffiths lived wholly on native food and covered large distances on foot through dangerous country. At all times his bearing and conduct were of a very high standard.

== Later life ==
Griffiths-Marsh wrote about his wartime experiences in his 1990 book Sixpenny Soldier. That same year the book was awarded both The Nettie Palmer Prize for Non-fiction (one of the Victorian Premier's Literary Awards), and the Colin Roderick Award, awarded annually for "the best book published in Australia which deals with any aspect of Australian life" along with the H.T. Priestley Memorial Medal. This book was republished under the title I was Only Sixteen in 1995.

Papers by Griffiths-Marsh about the training of his native guerrilla force and service in North Borneo are held at the Australian War Memorial.

Griffith-Marsh died on 29 December 2012 aged 89.

== Book details ==
- Sixpenny Soldier 1990 Australia: Collins-Angus & Robertson. Republished as
- I Was Only Sixteen 1995 Australia, Potts Point, N.S.W.: ETT Imprint. ISBN 1-875892-09-5 (pbk.)

== See also ==
- Jack Wong Sue
