= Operation Semut =

Allied World War II special operation in Borneo

- Part of the Japanese occupation of Sarawak during World War II
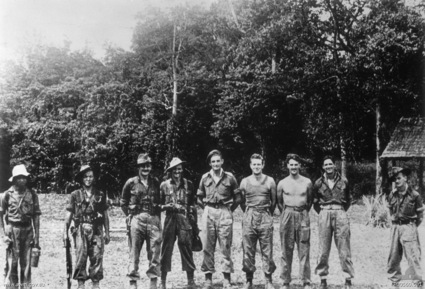
- Major G. S. Carter and Semut 2 team
Date	March – October 1945
Location	Borneo 4.1222539°N 115.3806217°E
Result	Allied victory

Belligerents
Empire of Japan	Australia; United Kingdom; New Zealand

Units involved
37th Army (elements)	Z Special Unit

Operation Semut was a series of reconnaissance operations carried out by Australia's Z Special Unit in 1945, during the final stages of World War II. This operation was the part of the Borneo Campaign, and was undertaken in Sarawak, northwestern Borneo, in support of Allied operations to secure North Borneo. Another closely related operation codenamed Agas was carried out concurrently in North Borneo (present day Sabah). Both operations combined and relayed their intelligence through the Stallion Project to Australian forces and carried out guerrilla warfare against the Japanese in the region with the full support of the local population. A total of four operations were undertaken under the auspices of Operation Semut, concluding in September and October 1945.

== Background ==
Early in the Pacific War, the Japanese had landed in north-west Borneo and had quickly captured the area's vital oilfields, which had begun contributing to their war effort by 1943. Allied efforts to interdict the flow of oil had been limited largely to aerial bombing in the intervening period as Allied ground efforts had focussed upon the drive on the Philippines. Planning for covert operations in Borneo by Allied forces, had begun shortly after the Japanese had captured north-west Borneo in December 1941. A British intelligence officer, Second Lieutenant P. M. Synge, based in Oxford, suggested that "a force of 500 men or more if necessary, skilled in forest-craft, could be raised..." from among the local population "...and organised into an effective guerilla force". Synge then submitted a proposal of the operations, but by February 1942 the operation had been rejected because it was not feasible at that time.

In July 1942, Tom Harrisson, who had been an Oxford Sarawak Expedition leader in 1932, drew another similar proposal that put an emphasis on operations against Seria oilfields in Brunei rather than Miri oilfields in Sarawak. Meanwhile, Captain D. L. Leach proposed to use former Borneo civil servants to identify and contact locals and Chinese who were still loyal to the Allied forces, to organise them and to establish three main bases along the Baram River, in the Rejang basin, and upriver on the Rejang in preparation to support large scale Allied operations in the area.

While these plans were not acted upon at the time, throughout 1942 and 1943, British and Australian Army planning staff worked to exchange information and sought out personnel who might be suitable for operations in Borneo; meanwhile, the Allies established several organisations, such as Special Operations Australia and its military arm, Z Special Unit, to carry out covert operations in the Pacific.

== Execution ==
Allied operations to capture Labuan and Brunei Bay were scheduled for mid-June. To support this, Operation Semut – derived from the Malay word for ant – was launched in March-1945 by the Australian Services Reconnaissance Department (SRD) with two main objectives: to gather intelligence and to train the indigenous people in launching guerrilla warfare against the Japanese. The operation was initially commanded by Major G. S. Carter, a New Zealander serving in the Australian Army, but was later divided into three main parties: Semut 1 under the command of Major Tom Harrisson, Semut 2 under the command of Carter himself, and Semut 3 under Captain W. L. P. Sochon, who had previously served as a police officer in Sarawak before the war. All three had experience of the conditions in Borneo prior to the war, and understood the local culture and possessed some language skills. Japanese troops occupying the area were drawn from the 37th Army.

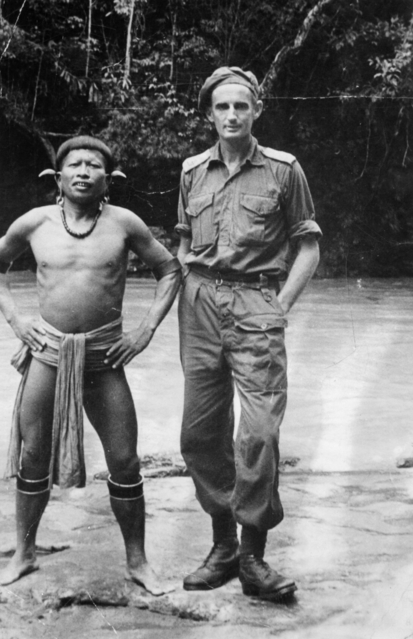
Major G. S. Carter and Dita Bala, a chief from Long Dati

Semut 1 would operate in the Trusan Valley and its surrounds, Semut 2 in the Baram Valley and its surrounds, and Semut 3 in the Rajang Valley. Harrisson and his Semut 1 team were inserted by parachute into the Kelabit Highlands, to operate around Bario, in March 1945; however, upon the completion of small airstrip in Bario by using local labour, he shifted his base to Belawit, which was located in the Bawang Valley, in Dutch Borneo. The Semut 2 team was also dropped by parachute around Bario in mid-April. After receiving support from the Kelabit people, the team was transferred to the Baram Valley where they established a base at Long Akah. Sochon then moved out from Semut 2's location and led the Semut 3 team to Belaga at Upper Rajang, with full support from the Kayan and Iban there. All the intelligence from these operations was relayed to General Thomas Blamey's Advanced Land Headquarters, locate at Morotai in the Halmahera. The Semut 2 team captured a Japanese communications station at Long Lama several days before the Allied landings around Labuan and Brunei Bay. On 9 June 1945, on the eve of the Australian landings at Labuan island, the Semut 1 team attacked a small Japanese garrison at Brunei Bay.

On 26 April 1945, a plan named Stallion was implemented to collect intelligence from Operations Semut and Agas regarding the Japanese positions at Brunei Bay. This information was passed by radio to the 9th Division headquarters on Morotai Island to support future operations in the area by elements of the 20th and 24th Infantry Brigades, which landed in north Borneo on 10 June 1945. Information gathered included troop dispositions, identification of transportation routes and staging points, information about Allied prisoners of war in the area, and the locations of Japanese airfields, food supplies and ammunition dumps.

Operation Semut 4 was split into two serials – 4A and 4B – which operated around Bintulu on the coast, having been inserted by sea, with the task of protecting the flank of the other three Semut parties. At Sarawak on 13 to 23 August 1945, Semut 4B sailed out of Labuan via HMAS Tigersnake and moored at Mukah. Party leader, Lieutenant Rowan Waddy, and Lieutenant Ron Hoey, paddling Hoehn folboats (collapsible canoes) journeyed along the Mukah River to engage, with the help of local natives, any remaining hostile Japanese groups. On the way they were threatened by a crocodile about the length of the folboat. Following the cessation of hostilities in mid-August, Semut operatives continued to work around Sapong under Harrisson until late October 1945, during which time they worked to secure the surrender of remaining Japanese troops who were engaged in fighting with local Bawang guerrillas. Throughout the operation, the inserted Semut personnel were resupplied by air by the Royal Australian Air Force's No. 200 Flight.

== Aftermath and impact ==
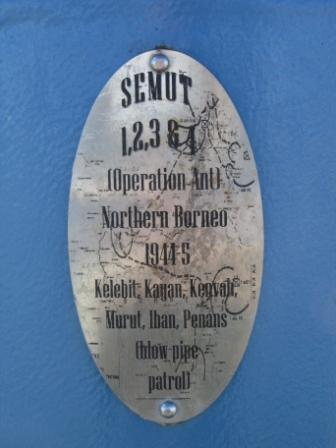
Commemorative plaque for Operation Semut at Rockingham, Western Australia

Assisted by the Agas and Semut operations, the Australian 9th Division was able to secure north Borneo, with major combat ending largely by July 1945. As the regular forces remained confined to the coastal areas, the Japanese moved inland and the irregular forces, particularly those assigned to Operation Semut, continued to play a role, calling in airstrikes on the withdrawing Japanese and working to restore civil administration. Following the cessation of hostilities, the regular Australian troops remained in north Borneo to restore law and order, and to facilitate the surrender of Japanese troops. Extensive civic actions began even before the end of the war, with efforts being turned to rebuilding the oil facilities and other damaged infrastructure, establishing schools, providing medical care to local civilians and restoring the water supply. Martial law was initially imposed, but eventually a civil administration was established under the British Borneo Civil Affairs Unit.

In analysing the operation, Ooi Keat Gin, writing in the Australian War Memorial Journal, concludes that both Operations Agas and Semut "achieved considerable results within a short period", and greatly assisted the wider Allied effort to secure north Borneo. Specifically, Semut 1 and 2 were considered to have achieved "remarkable success". In June 1945, Semut 1's elements were spread thinly, covering the entire northern Sarawak region and had an outpost at Pensiangan and as far as Tenom in North Borneo. They had also established several bases in Dutch Borneo. Sourced solely from the local population, the Australians were able to obtain information regarding Japanese positions and movements in Brunei and northern Sarawak, and information regarding prisoners of war and civilian internees in the region. About 600 natives were trained and supplied with weapons and ammunition. Semut 1 also carried out operations to focussed on disrupting Japanese subsistence operations and prevent the local population from providing labour to them.

Semut 2 also expanded their operational area to Bintulu and Upper Rajang in central Sarawak and trained a 350-strong local guerrilla force. Semut 3 expanded their operational area to Kapit in central Sarawak. In 1959, Tom Harrisson, in summing up Z Special Units operations claimed that "[t]he unit had inflicted some 1,700 casualties on the Japs at the cost of some 112 white lives", stating that Semut 1 had accounted for over 1,000 of the total 1,700 Japanese fatal casualties. Jim Truscott places Japanese casualties as a result of Operation Semut at around 1,500 with 240 captured. These were inflicted by a force of around 82 Allied soldiers, and 200 local guerrillas. There were no casualties amongst the Z Special Unit members assigned to Semut, along about 30 local guerrillas were killed during the fighting.

The information relayed by the local population, however, was sometimes erroneous, and the progress of Australian Imperial Force (AIF) in the region was hindered by incorrect information regarding Japanese strength and dispositions. In this regard, it has been concluded that Allied interrogators failed to assess the reliability of the information gathered before passing it to their headquarters. The local population was unable to differentiate facts and opinions from rumours circulating the region and subsequently passed incorrect information to the Australian forces. Due to Japanese counter-intelligence efforts, European officials could not be inserted into the Semut and Agas intelligence network to supervise the intelligence gathering.

== See also ==
- The 1969 novel Farewell to the King by Pierre Schoendoerffer was inspired by events from Operation Semut, in particular the role played by Tom Harrisson. The book was later turned into a film by John Milius – Farewell to the King.
