= Jack Wong Sue =

Z Special Unit member

- Born: 12 September 1925; Perth, Western Australia
- Died: 16 November 2009 (aged 84); Perth, Western Australia
- Military career
- Allegiance: Australia
- Branch: Royal Australian Air Force
- Service years: 1943–1946
- Rank: Leading Aircraftman
- Service number: 83783
- Unit: Z Special Unit No. 82 Operational Base Unit
- Conflicts: Second World War; Borneo campaign
- Awards: Medal of the Order of Australia; Distinguished Conduct Medal

Jack Wong Sue, OAM, DCM, JP (12 September 1925 – 16 November 2009), also known as Jack Sue (Chinese: 黄如彩), was a Chinese Australian from Perth, Western Australia. Wong Sue served as a member of the commando/special reconnaissance section, Z Special Unit, during the Second World War and was decorated with the Distinguished Conduct Medal. After the war, Wong Sue was a businessman, owning a diving store in the Perth suburb of Midland. He was also an author, a guide for tours of Borneo and a musician, who performed with bands in Perth for about 60 years.

== War service ==
On 25 September 1943, Wong Sue joined the Royal Australian Air Force (RAAF). During 1945, Wong Sue was among members of Z Special Unit who landed in Borneo, as part of Operation Agas 3. He reached the substantive rank of leading aircraftman, but acted as a sergeant for an extended period and was awarded the Distinguished Conduct Medal (DCM).

In 2010, Australian military historian Lynette Silver disputed claims made by Wong Sue in his memoirs and said that official archives prove that he "lied". In particular, she questioned Wong Sue's claims that he:

- Single-handedly killed a group of Japanese soldiers at Terusan, Borneo in May 1945, thereby saving the life of Lieutenant Don Harlem, as there were no enemy personnel in the area at the time;
- Took part in a raid on the Japanese garrison at Pitas on 13 June 1945, as he is not named in records of the action, and;
- Witnessed the last Sandakan Death March as he was in hospital when it occurred and was elsewhere when the other marches took place.

In early 2011, Jack Wong Sue's son, Barry, released a report in which he refuted the claims made by Silver against his father.

== Return to civilian life ==
Wong Sue was discharged from the RAAF on 21 January 1946, after which he returned to Perth and subsequently opened a retail store devoted to diving equipment in Midland, the first such store in Western Australia. On 13 September 1958, Wong Sue and his family were injured in a car accident near Kalamunda that resulted in the death of the driver of the other vehicle.

His published works include two books published circa 2001: a memoir of his military service, Blood on Borneo, and a collection of anecdotes regarding a 1963 shipwreck, Ghost of the Alkimos. In 2006, Wong Sue was awarded the Medal of the Order of Australia for "service to the community, particularly through the preservation and recording of military and maritime history." He died in a Perth hospice, aged 84, on 16 November 2009.

== See also ==
- Roland Griffiths-Marsh
