= Operation Python (1943–1944) =

Allied World War II special operation in Borneo

Operation Python (I, II, III and IV)
- Part of World War II
Date	1943–1944
Location	North Borneo

Belligerents
Z Special Unit; North Borneo Natives	Imperial Japanese Army; Imperial Japanese Navy

Operation Python was carried out by the Allied commando unit Z Special Unit, during World War II. The objective of the mission was to set up a wireless station near Labian Point in North Borneo and undertake covert operations reporting on the sea lane of the Imperial Japanese Navy in the Sibutu Passage and the Balabac Strait of the Sulu Sea. The operation was split into Python I and Python II.

Their first task was to plant three of their fellow operators with their radio transmitter at a safe distance, so that coded intelligence could be sent back to Australia. In their information forays and reconnaissance, they traveled many hundreds of miles at great risk using Hoehn military folboats along the coast and accessible inland waters.

== Operation Python I ==
Led by Major F. G. L. Chester, the Z Special Unit operatives landed along Labian Point in early October 1943. They also supported and provided equipment and stores for Filipino guerrillas under the command of an American officer, Captain J. A. Hamner.

== Operation Python II ==
In January 1944, Bill Jinkins led Z Special Unit operatives with the objective of organising the native population for guerrilla warfare. These early efforts did not bear any significant results.
